= List of cities, towns and villages in Kohgiluyeh and Boyer-Ahmad province =

A list of cities, towns and villages in Kohgiluyeh and Boyer-Ahmad Province of south-western Iran:

== Alphabetical ==
Cities are in bold text; all others are villages.

=== A ===
Ab Alvan | Ab Anjir-e Olya | Ab Anjir-e Sofla | Ab Aspid Guzenan | Ab Bagh-e Bonari | Ab Bahareh-ye Chin | Ab Balutak | Ab Balut-e Bonari | Ab Behan | Ab Beli Zilayi | Ab Bid | Ab Bidak-e Zilayi | Ab Bid-e Deli Rich-e Olya | Ab Bid-e Heygun | Ab Bid-e Mazeh Koreh | Ab Chenar-e Bid Anjir | Ab Chenaru | Ab Chendar | Ab Chendar | Ab Chendaran-e Olya Gelal | Ab Chendaran-e Sofla Gelal | Ab Chendaran-e Tal Deraz | Ab Chendar-e Guzenan | Ab Darreh | Ab Darreh-ye Junak | Ab Darusheh-ye Chin | Ab Garmak-e Guznan | Ab Garmak-e Olya-ye Neqareh Khaneh | Ab Garmak-e Sofla-ye Neqareh Khaneh | Ab Garmak-e Vosta-ye Neqareh Khaneh | Ab Garmu | Ab Gavan-e Bozorg | Ab Gavan-e Kuchek | Ab Gerdu | Ab Gol | Ab Hajjat-e Chahar Bisheh | Ab Jirak | Ab Kanaru | Ab Kaseh | Ab Kaseh-ye Tal Deraz | Ab Kel Shisheh | Ab Kenaru | Ab Koreh Tal | Ab Kori | Ab Lami-ye Guzenan | Ab Mahi | Ab Murd-e Dam Ludab | Ab Murd-e Tangiar | Ab Mu-ye Olya | Ab Mu-ye Sofla | Ab Nuk | Ab Piyazi | Ab Qanat-e Eshkaft Dudar | Ab Razgeh | Ab Rigun | Ab Sardan-e Olya Jowkar | Ab Sardan-e Sofla Jowkar | Ab Sardan-e Tal Deraz | Ab Sepa | Ab Shirin | Ab Ti-ye Mahtab | Ab Tut | Ab Zahli-ye Tarzayi | Ab Zalu-ye Kandeh | Ab Zalu-ye Olya-ye Neqareh Khaneh | Ab Zalu-ye Sofla-ye Neqareh Khaneh | Ab Zalu-ye Vosta-ye Neqareh Khaneh | Ab Zani | Abadeh | Abbas Ali Khani | Abbas Ali va Qafeleh Bah | Abdehgah | Ableh | Ablun | Abputi Gelal | Abrizak | Abrizi | Abrizi Parikdan | Adrkan | Adur | Ahmad Gharib | Ahmad Qalandari | Ahmad Salar-e Kalat Tayebi | Ahmad-e Naseri | Ahuravak | Airport Industrial Zone | Akbarabad | Alakan | Algan | Ali Askari | Ali Karami-ye Olya | Ali Reza Gerdab | Aliabad-e Ab Kaseh | Aliabad-e Kukhdan | Aliabad-e Mokhtar | Aliabad-e Sartol | Allahabad | Almur | Alqchin-e Olya | Alqchin-e Sofla | Amir Gopi | Amir ol Mowmenin | Amir ol Mowmenin | Amir Shirkhan | Amirabad-e Babakan | Amirabad-e Olya | Amirabad-e Sisakht | Amirabad-e Sofla | Amirabad-e Talkhab | Amirabad-e Vosta Key Mohammad Khan | Amirshahriyar | Anarak-e Barmeyun | Anbar Shahi | Anbargah | Andarun-e Bid Anjir | Anjir Siah | Anjir-e Sefid | Anjireh | Anjomeh | Anna | Aqa Ali Penah | Arend | Aru | Askan Ashayir Deli Bajak | Askan Ashayir-e Kolagh Neshin | Askarabad-e Deli Bajak | Ateshgah-e Bozorg | Ayneh Bazar-e Mahtab | Azadi-ye Dam Ludab | Azizi-ye Olya | Azizi-ye Sofla | Azizi-ye Vosta

=== B ===
Ba Qala Dun | Ba Shahsavar | Baba Ahmad | Baba Kalan | Badam Gerdaki | Badamdan | Badamestan | Badarreh | Badengan-e Olya | Badengan-e Sofla | Bag | Baghcheh-ye Jalil | Bagh-e Anjirak | Bagh-e Kalak | Bagh-e Tilku-ye Chenar | Bahman Gazali | Bahman Yari | Bahram Beygi-ye Olya Samandi | Bahrehana | Bahsun-e Mushemi | Bajereh | Bajuli | Bakaludun-e Shabliz | Bal Chokupichab | Bal Rud | Balahdan | Balahzar | Baluchestan-e Shutavar | Balut Bangan | Balut Hesar | Balutak Khurshid | Balut-e Karavan | Bamuni Dam Tang-e Divan-e Mahtab | Banestan-e Jalil | Banestan-e Sadat Mahmudi | Bar Aftab-e Ali Karami | Bar Aftab-e Emam Reza | Bar Aftab-e Jalaleh | Bar Aftab-e Khorbel | Bar Aftab-e Kochala | Bar Aftab-e Sarfaryab | Bar Aftab-e Sefid | Bar Aftab-e Silab | Bar Aftab-e Sofla | Bar Aftab-e Tahlivan | Baraftab-e Poshtkuh | Bard Espid Murderaz | Bard Kolang-e Olya Chahar Tall | Bard Rasun-e Olya | Bard Rasun-e Sofla | Bard Zard | Bard-e Gapi-ye Charbiyun | Bard-e Khiari | Bard-e Pahn Abdol Latif | Bard-e Pahn-e Zilayi | Bardian | Bardkandeh | Bardkashki | Barm Alvan | Barm-e Siah Rudtalkh | Barmeyun | Barqulong-e Bajuli | Barreh Mal | Basht | Basiti Qarteq | Bataveh-ye Najak | Bavari | Bazarnag | Behareh-ye Bard-e Khiari | Beheshtabad | Behzadi-e Neqareh Khaneh | Betari | Biareh | Bibi Hakimeh | Bibi Janabad | Bibi Khatun | Bibi Zoleykhai | Bid Barzeh-ye Sefidar | Bidak-e Olya | Bidak-e Salar | Bidak-e Sohrab | Bidastan | Bidastan-e Murderaz | Bidzard | Bidzard | Bifah Zari | Bilukhar | Bimenjgan | Biseytun | Bisheh Khoshku | Bishehi | Bizhgan | Bolviri | Bon Darreh | Bon Zard-e Olya | Bon Zard-e Sofla | Bonah Aliyari | Bonar Shadali | Bonari | Bonari-ye Fathi | Bonari-ye Olya | Bonari-ye Sofla | Bondarreh | Boneh Balut | Boneh Deraz-e Mushemi | Boneh-ye Akhund | Boneh-ye Pir | Boneh-ye Sarhadi | Bongir | Bontuf-e Mohamid-e Biseytun | Borai | Borghun | Borj-e Ali Shir | Borj-e Ali Shir-e Olya | Borj-e Bahmani | Borj-e Jowkar | Bormamian | Borm-e Sabz | Borm-e Shir | Bowa-ye Olya | Bowa-ye Sofla | Buneh Dam Sefidar | Buneh Rizak-e Chenar | Burak-e Olya | Burak-e Sofla | Burbadi | Busangan | Bustan | Bustan-e Kuchek | Buyeri

=== C ===
Chaftab-e Barmeyun | Chaghal | Chah Bardi | Chah Gorgi | Chah Kardqiam | Chah Paznan | Chah Riz | Chah Rowghani | Chah Talkhab-e Olya | Chahab | Chahar Angaj-e Jowkar | Chahar Bisheh District Poultry Facility | Chahar Bisheh Industrial Estate | Chahar Bisheh-ye Olya | Chahar Bisheh-ye Sofla | Chahar Meh | Chahar Murun-e Jowkar | Chahar Murun-e Tamdari | Chahar Qash-e Chari | Chahar Rah Beheshti Sapu | Chahar Rah | Chahar Rah-e Ali Tayyeb | Chahar Rah-e Chari | Chahar Rah-e Gashin | Chahar Rah-e Soleyman | Chahar Tall-e Mir Mohammad Fasiyeh | Chahar Tang-e Qalandari | Chahtun | Chal Badam-e Kata | Chal Bagh | Chal Baghcheh-ye Zilayi | Chal Baniu Dasht Rum | Chal Geru | Chal Khorsi-ye Silab | Chal Kola | Chal Kub Pereshkaft | Chal Shahin-e Khoda Bakhsh | Chal Siah Manchatun Jowkar | Chaldal | Chal-e Siyah Gelal | Chali | Chalmureh | Cham Arabi-ye Pataveh | Cham Asiyab | Cham Bolbol | Cham Khun | Cham Lapeh | Cham Murd | Cham Sharu | Cham-e Ali Mordani | Chandar | Changal | Changalva | Charam | Chat Barik-e Jahanabad | Chat Kuh-e Bahram Beygi | Chehel Dokhtaran | Chel Mohammad-e Baqeri Pereshkaft | Chelchelak | Cheleh Gah-e Zarchas | Chenar Barm-e Olya | Chenarestan-e Olya | Chenarestan-e Sofla | Chenarestan-e Vosta | Cheshmeh Amiri | Cheshmeh Anjir-e Firuzabad | Cheshmeh Bah Meleh Khomsir | Cheshmeh Balutak | Cheshmeh Chenar-e Mard Khoda | Cheshmeh Chenar-e Yasuj | Cheshmeh Darreh | Cheshmeh Darreh-ye Amirabad | Cheshmeh Dozdak-e Olya | Cheshmeh Dozdak-e Sofla | Cheshmeh Goli-ye Shahniz | Cheshmeh Jafteh Tang Alak | Cheshmeh Jiuri Montangun | Cheshmeh Khani Firuzabad | Cheshmeh Khersi Pirvezg | Cheshmeh Mir Hasani | Cheshmeh Murd Baraber | Cheshmeh Nesai-ye Banestan | Cheshmeh Pahn Ganjegan | Cheshmeh Pahn-e Dasht Rum | Cheshmeh Puti Leh Frakh | Cheshmeh Qanat-e Deli Khomsir | Cheshmeh Qanat-e Junak | Cheshmeh Reshteh | Cheshmeh Rizak-e Shabliz | Cheshmeh Roqat | Cheshmeh Sib-e Deli Khomsir | Cheshmeh Tabarqu | Cheshmeh Tagi | Cheshmeh Vesg-e Deli Khomsir | Cheshmeh Zaferan | Cheshmeh-ye Gari Deli Gerdu | Cheshmeh-ye Lashehi-ye Jowkar | Cheshmeh-ye Mohammad Beygi Dam Run | Cheshmeh-ye Rashid Meleh Bahram Beygi | Cheshmeh-ye Sib Deli Gerdu Sofla | Chir | Chitab | Chitab | Chitaveh-ye Pereshkaft | Chong Dam-e Ludab | Choqeh-ye Sorkh-e Bahram Beygi | Choru | Chub Kanam |

=== D ===
Dalun | Dam Ab Bahareh-ye Chin | Dam Bil Dun Deli Rich-e Olya | Dam Chenar-e Azizi | Dam Chenar-e Hadiabad | Dam Darreh Gepi | Dam Eshkaft-e Muneh | Dam Rud-e Ayuk Dar Kheyari | Dam Saqaveh-ye Aziz | Dam Sefidar | Dam Tang-e Chahen | Dam Tang-e Darrehna | Dam Tang-e Kap | Dam Tang-e Landeh | Dam Tang-e Miyan Tangan | Dam Tang-e Nal Ashkenan-e Mahtab | Dam Tang-e Orveh | Dam Tang-e Sarna | Dam Tang-e Sheykh Sarkeh | Dam Tang-e Sulak | Dam Tang-e Tikab | Damdarreh-ye Bibi Roshteh | Dam-e Abbas | Dam-e Abbas Chicken Company | Dam-e Tang-e Bavary | Dam-e Tang-e Molghun | Dam-e Tang-e Shahid Deli Bajak | Dameshkaft-e Kalat | Damla Espid | Dammahad | Dar Boland | Dar Espid-e Mushemi | Dar Ganji | Darb Kalat-e Emamzadeh Mahmud | Darbari | Darbari-ye Dam-e Abbas | Darbari-ye Jowkar | Darbari-ye Mohammad Hoseyn Zilayi | Dargandeh | Darghak | Darreh Bang | Darreh Bang Rugardengah | Darreh Bangaru | Darreh Basht | Darreh Bid | Darreh Bid-e Deli Gerdu | Darreh Bid-e Jowkar | Darreh Bid-e Murzard | Darreh Bidi Sefidar | Darreh Chapi-ye Jowkar | Darreh Chenari-ye Kareyak | Darreh Darreh Rezaabad | Darreh Darreh-ye Olya | Darreh Dazdan | Darreh Deraz-e Chin | Darreh Garm-e Chenar | Darreh Gepi | Darreh Gerow Chong | Darreh Geru-ye Olya | Darreh Geru-ye Sofla | Darreh Goru Firuzabad | Darreh Gudarzi | Darreh Jafti Dasht | Darreh Kal | Darreh Kalgah-e Pereshkaft | Darreh Kartikab | Darreh Key Ali Khani | Darreh Key Salehi | Darreh Khani Pereshkaft | Darreh Kharzahreh | Darreh Kharzaleh Deh Chel | Darreh Khoshk | Darreh Khunbazi Dam-e Saqaveh | Darreh Khvajeh | Darreh Labak | Darreh Lir | Darreh Mahini | Darreh Mari-ye Babakan | Darreh Nari-ye Dam Ludab | Darreh Ney | Darreh Seheh | Darreh Shirin | Darreh Shiri-ye Gerdab | Darreh Shur | Darreh Sureh | Darreh Tang Ti | Darreh Tey Tahlivan | Darreh Zang | Darreh Zari | Darreh Zari-ye Ajam | Darreh-ye Akhund | Darreh-ye Bani Yab Bahram Beygi | Darreh-ye Harcheh | Darreh-ye Mari Shabliz | Darshahi | Darvar-e Fartaq | Daryab | Dasht Hajj Mortezi Mahur Pagach | Dasht Kun Kalamak Gelal | Dasht Si Chanlu Pakuh | Dashtak Dishmuk | Dashtak-e Meymand | Dasht-e Ahu | Dasht-e Azadi-ye Javardeh | Dasht-e Ban | Dasht-e Boz | Dasht-e Mazeh | Dasht-e Mowrd-e Ghurk | Dasht-e Naseri | Dasht-e Qazi | Dasht-e Raz | Dasiri | Dastgerd | Dastgerd | Daverpenah | Davudabad-e Mokhtar | Deh Bal | Deh Bardel-e Dam Saqaveh | Deh Bid-e Charbiyun | Deh Boniab-e Charbiyun | Deh Bozorg | Deh Bozorg-e Pereshkaft | Deh Chal Deli Rich-e Olya | Deh Chal-e Dam-e Ludab | Deh Chol-e Ka Abdel | Deh Dam Barm Murzard | Deh Emamzadeh-ye Biseytun | Deh Fazelabad Run | Deh Gah-e Jalaleh | Deh Kohneh-e Mazdak | Deh Kohneh-ye Zafari | Deh Kond | Deh Mir Qomsur Deli Rich-e Olya | Deh Miridallah Rak | Deh Naseh-ye Mazkur Gelal | Deh Neseh-e Deli Gerdu-ye Sofla | Deh Now-e Darghak | Deh Now-e Kakan | Deh Now-e Kukhdan | Deh Now-ye Gelal | Deh Qanat-e Charbiyun | Deh Qazi | Deh Sam-e Ludab | Deh Sereshk | Deh Sheykh-e Pataveh | Deh Sheykh-e Tasuj | Deh Shirin-e Badengan | Deh Sukhteh-ye Dam Ludab | Deh Tut | Dehdasht | Deh-e Ahmad | Deh-e Amidvar | Deh-e Amir Bahader | Deh-e Aqa Shafi | Deh-e Balut | Deh-e Bar Aftab Vali-ye Jowkar | Deh-e Bar Aftab-e Olya | Deh-e Baraber | Deh-e Bardel | Deh-e Bid Pichab | Deh-e Bonar-e Yusefi | Deh-e Bozorg-e Firuzabad | Deh-e Chati | Deh-e Chol-e Delita | Deh-e Ebrahim | Deh-e Jalil | Deh-e Kabahar | Deh-e Kabuter Pirzal | Deh-e Khalifeh | Deh-e Mansur | Deh-e Mir Khodayar | Deh-e Molla Malek | Deh-e Murd-e Olya | Deh-e Nar | Deh-e Narravak | Deh-e Pain-e Darb Kalat | Deh-e Pakel Allah Reza | Deh-e Ramezan | Deh-e Sheykh Dilgun | Deh-e Sheykhan | Deh-e Tol | Deh-e Zu ol Faqar Sarperi | Dehkohneh-ye Hamidabad | Dehnow-e Emamzadeh Mahmud | Dehnow-e Jowkar | Dehnow-e Ludab | Dehnow-e Sarfaryab | Dehnow-e Talkhab | Dehnow-e Tall Gap | Dehnow-e Telmargh | Dehnow-e Yasuj | Delavari-ye Gorgian | Delgerak | Deli Barik-e Rudbal | Deli Bejak-e Sefidar | Deli Gerdu-ye Olya | Deli Hermun | Deli Ji-ye Emamqoli | Deli Ji-ye Gholam | Deli Ji-ye Mandani | Deli Rich-e Sofla | Deli Robat | Deli Savari | Deli | Deli | Delik-e Tayebi | Delitangu-ye Sofla | Deliyak | Delkun | Delyasar-e Olya | Delyasar-e Sofla | Derb-e Miyan Ab | Derk | Dezdak | Dezh Soleyman | Diasham Karreh | Dil | Dimeh Kuh-e Khayiz | Dimkuh Shush | Dintal-e Habibabad | Dishmok | Do Ab-e Kalus | Do Bandab Chati-ye Mahtab | Do Kuhak | Do Par Barzian | Do Rah-e Bahram Beygi | Do Rah-e Ghomashkeh | Do Rizgan | Doab-e Bilukher | Doband-e Sar Mast Dammahad | Dogonbadan | Dogonbadan Police Station | Domiyeh | Dorahi-ye Gachboland | Doruhan-e Neqareh Khaneh | Dowband-e Cheshmeh Puti | Dowband-e Shahniz | Dowlatabad | Dowpar Nazari | Dowpar-e Qabr-e Kiamars | Dowput | Dowruhan-e Jalil | Dozdak | Duk | Dul Abza | Dulab-e Shirin | Dulab-e Talkh | Dul-e Bozorg Khan Ahmad | Durab-e Olya-ye Jadid | Durab-e Qadim | Durab-e Sofla-ye Jadid | Durah Sadat | Duraheh-ye Sofla Gelal | Durahi Sefidar | Durak | Durishun | Duruh

=== E ===
Edrag | Emamzadeh Askar | Emamzadeh Esmail | Emamzadeh Jafar | Emamzadeh Mahmud | Emamzadeh Mir Salar Fartaq | Emamzadeh Pahlavan | Emamzadeh Sadat | Emamzamen | Emarat | Eqbalabad-e Sisakht | Esfahan Police Compound | Esfandan | Eshkaft Gav Mishi Kuh Sorkh | Eshkaft Shah-e Sofla | Eshkaft Siah | Eshkaft Siah | Eshkaft-e Dudar | Eshkaft-e Olya Gelal | Eshkaft-e Qateri Murzard | Eshkaft-e Shiri | Eskandari | Eskandari-ye Barmeyun | Eslamabad-e Baba Ahmad | Eslamabad-e Bagh-e Nar | Eslamabad-e Darshahi | Eslamabad-e Deh Now | Eslamabad-e Ghurk | Eslamabad-e Heydarabad | Eslamabad-e Jalil | Eslamabad-e Lishtar | Eslamabad-e Mashayekh | Eslamabad-e Nazmakan | Eslamabad-e Tang Seh Riz | Eslamabad-e Tang Sorkh | Esper | Eydanak

=== F ===
Fariab-e Kalamak | Faryab Tut | Fashian | Fath | Fazelabad-e Talkhab | Filgah

=== G ===
Gabrestan | Gach Boland | Gach Gerd | Gachi | Gaduk Boneh-ye Pir | Gahgah Ahmad | Gandak | Gandom Kesh-e Chitab | Gandomkal | Ganj-e Besiar | Ganjegan-e Olya | Ganjegan-e Sofla | Ganjehi-ye Kohneh | Ganjehi-ye Seh Riz | Garab Dishmuk | Garab | Garab-e Olya | Garab-e Sofla | Gardan Partaraj Tang Pivareh | Gardan Tol-e Barmeyun | Gardaneh-ye Chahar Murun-e Margown | Gardangah | Gardeh Ruch | Gardekan | Gargiu | Garkolagh Neshin | Garmasha | Garr-e Kalagh Neshin-e Amirabad | Garri-ye Ab Kenaru | Garsevareh | Garus | Garuzeh | Gashtiari | Gav Barg | Gavdaneh-ye Ali Reza | Gavdaneh-ye Ludab | Gavpash Kesteh | Gazdan | Gehurmordeh-ye Silab | Gendi Khori-ye Olya | Gendi Khori-ye Sofla | Gendi Khori-ye Vosta | Gerdab-e Olya | Gerdab-e Saqaveh | Gerdab-e Sofla | Gerdangeh Sartaveh | Gerdaveh | Gerd-e Kuchak | Gerdeh Pey-e Ajam | Gerdkalat | Gerdukangak | Geshur-e Zilayi | Ghazanfari Khan Ahmad-e Sofla | Ghazanfarkhani | Gholam Ali Pirvezg | Ghurak-e Olya | Ghurak-e Sofla | Ghurak-e Vosta | Godar Shahri | Godar Takhti | Gol Zadini-ye Zirkal | Gol-e Chaharabad-e Sadat Mahmudi | Goleh-ye Khur-e Mushemi | Golestan-e Emamzadeh Jafar | Golshan-e Bozorg Mokhtar | Gonaveh | Gonbadbardi-ye Olya | Gonbadbardi-ye Sofla | Gorak | Gorgian | Gormowla | Goshtasb Khan Ahmad-e Sofla | Gowd-e Belhi | Gowd-e Gol-e Bibi Hakimeh | Gowd-e Murd | Gowd-e Talkhdan-e Zilayi | Gowdelun | Gowhargan-e Sofla | Gudband | Gudtak | Gurab | Gurab | Gurdalu-ye Ab Razgeh | Gur-e Ganju | Guri | Gurtork | Gusheh-ye Olya | Gusheh-ye Shahzadeh Qasem | Gusheh-ye Sofla | Guznan

=== H ===
Habibabad-e Mazdak | Haft Cheshmeh | Haft Cheshmeh-ye Dalun | Haft Cheshmeh-ye Lishtar | Hajj Qalandar | Hamzehkhani | Hasanabad-e Kareyak | Hasanabad-e Tabarqu | Hasanabad-e Tang Sorkh | Hasht Peyman | Hasteh Kuh | Hejrat Durab | Heridun-e Zirkal | Heydarabad | Heydarabad-e Olya | Heydarabad-e Sofla | Heydarabad-e Tang Seh Riz | Hiati | Hoseynabad-e Mokhtar | Hoseynabad-e Olya | Hoseynabad-e Rowshanabad | Hoseynabad-e Sofla | Hoseynieh-ye Sar Bardian | Hoseynkhani | Hud

=== I ===
Iliyabad

=== J ===
Jadval-e Darta Mokhtar | Jadval-e Ghureh-ye Mehrian | Jadval-e Ghureh-ye Mokhtar | Jadval-e Ghureh-ye Nareh Gah | Jahadabad-e Cheshmeh Tagi | Jahadabad-e Narak | Jahan Bakhsh | Jahanabad-e Baraftab | Jahanabad-e Markazi | Jahanabad-e Sofla | Jahaniabad | Jamu | Jan Khani | Javanak-e Mohammad Hasan | Javardeh | Jelu | Jovonak | Jowberiz | Jowkar | Jowzar | Jurak-e Nasibollah | Jurak-e Nowzar

=== K ===
Kabgivan | Kabmun Ali | Kabuneh | Kabutaran | Kachalun | Kafsh Kanan | Kahdunki-ye Mushemi | Kal Bazar | Kal Kalab | Kal Khvajeh-ye Qeysari | Kal Malai-ye Jowkar | Kal Mazad Boneh Pir | Kal Qanat-e Jahanabad | Kal Qeysari-ye Olya | Kal Shur | Kalab-e Ahmad | Kalab-e Olya | Kalab-e Sofla | Kalab-e Vosta | Kalah Gun | Kalak-e Sar Bisheh | Kalat Buneh Rah Dozdan | Kalat | Kalat | Kalatak | Kal-e Jamshid | Kalgah Jalil | Kalgah-e Pahn | Kalgeh Borun | Kalgeh Zari | Kalgeh-ye Amir Sheykhi | Kalleh Gah | Kalleh Sur-e Shabliz | Kalmak-e Gelal | Kalus-e Markazi | Kalus-e Olya | Kalus-e Sofla | Kalus-e Vosta | Kaluvar | Kamak-e Azizollah | Kamak-e Gorg Ali | Kamak-e Khoda Rahem | Kamak-e Khodadad | Kamak-e Nad Ali | Kamak-e Rah Khoda | Kamak-e Safer | Kamalabad | Kamardugh | Kandal | Kandeh Kuh Sardu | Kanjed Zar | Karand | Kareh Kareh | Kareyak | Karimabad | Karkar Morghi Deli Bajak | Karreh Dan Zizi | Karreh Karami | Karreh Shahbazi | Karreh-ye Olya | Karreh-ye Sofla | Karun | Kat Siah | Kat | Kata | Kataj | Katal Vasili | Kateh | Katuzar Murzard | Kazangan-e Olya | Kazangan-e Sofla | Kelavan-e Rudtalkh | Kelayeh-ye Olya | Kelayeh-ye Sofla | Kelayeh-ye Vosta | Kelkel-e Abbasabad | Kemyan | Kendal | Khadamabad-e Mokhtar | Khahki-ye Chitab | Khalafabad | Khalafabad-e Lishtar | Khalifehi | Khang Bonar | Khang Narbaneh Pir | Kharbal | Kharestan | Kharter | Kharun Rah | Khersan | Kheyarkal | Kheymand | Kheyrabad Khalifeh | Kheyrabad-e Naser | Kheyrabad-e Seyf Laleh | Kheyrabad-e Sofla | Khiyarkaran | Khomeyniabad-e Darshahi | Khong | Khorram Rah | Khoshkedan-e Babakan | Khoshkedan-e Olya | Khumkar | Khungah | Khurdeki | Khvosh Ab-e Shirin | Kimeh-ye Olya | Kimeh-ye Sofla | Kohleh Bardkuh Shah Bahram | Kohleh-ye Hammam | Kohnab | Kolgeh Deli Rich-e Olya | Kombol | Kondeh Gurab | Kondideh | Kor Kor Zar | Kord Laghari | Kotak | Kowkhdan | Kuh Pat | Kuh-e Rak | Kuhsarak-e Olya | Kuhsarak-e Sofla | Kulab-e Fartaq | Kuland-e Zilayi | Kularzan | Kun-e Espid | Kunmesi | Kunmish | Kursay Pirzal | Kushk Talkh-e Darghak | Kushk | Kushk | Kushk-e Abul | Kushk-e Amir ol Momeyin | Kushk-e Ghandi | Kushk-e Olya | Kushk-e Zafari

=== L ===
La Espid Seyyed Fakhr | Lah Farakh-e Mushemi | Lah Frakh Melleh Namdaran | Lah Gavi Dalun | Lah Mari-ye Jowkar | Lah Meleh-ye Olya-ye Jowkar | Lah Meleh-ye Sofla-ye Jowkar | Lah Mohammad Khani | Lah Var Hoseyn-e Olya | Lahsavareh | Lal-e Mina | Lamab-e Barmeyun | Lamab-e Gol Espid | Lamakun | Lama-ye Olya | Lama-ye Sofla | Landeh | Lar | Larub | Larub | Lash | Lavar | Laveh Pay Tall | Leh Howzi | Likak | Lilun | Lir Sukhteh-ye Ludab | Lir Tahrak | Lirab | Lirab | Liravak | Lirburak | Lir-e Bozorg | Lir-e Kuchek | Lirkak | Lirkari | Liru Gerdaveh | Liru Nasrollah | Liseh Dar Gonji | Lishkan | Lukireh

=== M ===
Madavan-e Olya | Madavan-e Sofla | Mafeh-ye Rudtalkh | Mahad | Mahmudabad-e Olya | Mahsati Pichab | Mahur Sabz-e Neqareh Khaneh | Mahur-e Basht | Mal Molla | Maladara Sartali | Mal-e Akhund | Malekabad | Malsheykh | Mama Zeynab | Man Darreh Algan | Mangezur | Manlava | Mansurabad-e Mehdiyeh | Mansurabad-e Sarab Khamzan | Mansurkhani | Mardan Masum | Mard-e Khoda | Margh-e Chenar | Margown | Marin | Marum Radeh | Marznagun | Mashhadi Muri | Mashk Kar Jalaleh | Masumabad va Aliabad-e Kareyak | Mazeh Farj-e Esfandan | Mazeh Kaz | Mazeh Kharideh | Mehdiabad-e Jalaleh | Mehdiabad-e Khan Ahmad | Mehrababad | Mehrabad | Mehrian | Meleh Abgir | Meleh Khvoish-e Sofla | Meleh Seleh-ye Olya | Meleh Shitab | Meyaneh | Meydan | Meymand | Mian Chenar-e Mazkur | Mian Darreh Jowkar | Mian Tangan | Mir Ali Mohammad | Mir Ayaz | Mir Aziz | Miraslan | Mirghazab | Mirjaber Pichab | Mirza Ali Bahram Beygi | Mirza Bahram Beygi | Mirza Khani | Mirza Qoli-ye Bahram Beygi | Mirza Rahim | Mohammad Khan Tang-e Sepu | Mohammad Taladam Tang Divan-e Mahtab | Mohammadabad | Mohammadabad-e Ashur Pashur | Mohammadabad-e Lishtar | Mohammadabad-e Salehan | Mohammadabad-e Tang Seh Riz | Molehbarik-e Babakan | Molla Sartip | Mollah Barfi | Mollah-ye Tam | Mondan | Moradi Pereshkaft | Mowg | Mowrd | Mozaffarabad | Mozaffari | Mugarm | Muger | Muger | Munah | Mungirah | Munj | Mur Deraz | Murd Risheh | Murd-e Seyyed Gambuli | Murderaz-e Olya | Murderaz-e Rahbar | Murderaz-e Sofla | Murderaz-e Vosta | Murdi | Mur-e Gham-e Vosta | Mur-e Jowkar | Murgah Kakan | Muri-ye Ajam | Murjan | Murkhani | Murun-e Pas Bagh | Murzard-e Nasrollah | Mushemi | Mushemi-ye Olya | Mushemi-ye Sofla | Mushemi-ye Vosta

=== N ===
Nadeh Gandi Khuri | Nadeh-ye Barmeyun | Naderabad-e Neqareh Khaneh | Najafabad | Nakhjir | Nakhudkal | Naqareh Khaneh-ye Filgah | Narak | Narbi Payeh Chaharqash | Naregun Hasan | Narehgah-e Markazi | Narg-e Musa | Nargesi | Nargesi-ye Guznan | Narmun | Narsun | Naseh Gowd-e Harmun-e Jowkar | Naseh Gowd-e Vali Khan-e Jowkar | Naseh Talkhah-e Zarguruk-e Olya | Naseh Talkhah-e Zarguruk-e Sofla | Naseh Tavis | Naseh-ye Mur-e Gham | Naserabad | Nasrollah Jahan Bin | Nazarabad | Nazgun-e Olya | Nazmakan-e Olya | Nazmakan-e Sofla | Nehzatabad | Nehzat-e Olya | Neqareh Khaneh | Nesah Kuh Ali Chin | Nesah Kuh Veysi Chin | Nesah Kuh-e Bard | Nesah-ye Allahdad | Nesah-ye Mazkur va Nasrollah | Nesah-ye Mohammad Taher | Nesah-ye Olya | Nesah-ye Sofla | Ney Kan | Neyab-e Ab Kenaru | Nimdur | Nohom

=== O ===
Orf | Orveh-ye Olya | Orveh-ye Sofla | Orveh-ye Vosta | Owlak-e Beyt Allah |

=== P ===
Pa Chong | Pa Gach-e Kal Jamshid | Pachat-e Charbiyun | Pachat-e Delita | Pachat-e Jowkar | Padeh | Paduk | Pakuh | Paleki-ye Abdi | Panbeh Zar Abdehgah | Papar | Par Zard | Parah Ardeshir-e Jadid | Parah-e Hirami | Pareshkaft-e Darb Kalat | Parhuz-e Talkhab Shirin | Parikedun | Parkanji | Parvizak | Pas Asiab-e Fartaq | Pas Bagh-e Shamshir | Pas Bayar | Pas Chat Delik | Pas Chat Sharang Rang | Pas Resh | Pas Tuk | Pasheh Kan | Pat Pat | Pataveh | Pataveh | Pataveh | Pataveh-ye Ajam | Pataveh-ye Charusa | Pataveh-ye Delita | Pataveh-ye Gelal | Pataveh-ye Kari | Pataveh-ye Pey Rah | Pataveh-ye Rud Sameh | Pay Par Rud Sameh | Pazanan | Pazanan Deli Ali Penah Beygi | Pazanan-e Deh Chel | Pazin | Peh Nuk | Pey Abzar | Pey Zard-e Bahram Beygi-ye Olya | Pi Kharabeh Darrehna | Pir Badami | Pir Hajjati | Pir Murad | Pir Sabz | Pir-e Sefid | Pirvezg | Piyeh | Pizak Khalifehi | Pol Abza Jalaleh | Posht Bam | Posht Chenar | Poshtaveh-ye Olya | Poshtaveh-ye Sofla | Posht-e Chah | Poshteh Ab Bal | Puleh | Purazh | Purjavid | Putab | Puzeh Bali-ye Boland | Puzeh Do Demeh | Puzeh Sefid | Puzeh-ye Kharaftkhaneh | Puzeh-ye Kuhbord | Puzeh-ye Tiz Ab Safer

=== Q ===
Qaba Sukhteh | Qabr-e Qeysar | Qalat | Qalat | Qalatak | Qalat-e Bar Aftab | Qalat-e Markazi-ye Hamidabad | Qaleh Dokhtar | Qaleh Mombi | Qaleh Raisi | Qalehbani | Qaleh-e Saqaveh | Qaleh-ye Bani-ye Mushemi | Qaleh-ye Dezh Kuh | Qaleh-ye Dezh Nargesi | Qaleh-ye Gol | Qanat-e Bahram Beygi | Qanbarabad | Qasemabad-e Jalil | Qashkamari | Qashkamari-ye Boneh Pir | Qods Garrison

=== R ===
Rag Boli Karnad | Rahmali | Rajuneh Kari | Rak | Reki | Rigun | Rizak | Rostam Zemani | Rowshanabad | Ruch-e Sofla | Ruchek | Rud Rish | Rud Sameh | Rudashti | Rudbal | Rud-e Ayuk Dar Kheyari | Rudnun

=== S ===
Saadatabad | Saadatabad-e Lishtar | Sabur-e Bozorg | Sabur-e Kuchek | Sadat Gerdeli Lash | Sadatabad | Sadatabad-e Lishtar | Sadat-e Chahan | Sadeqi | Sadrollah | Safarabad-e Chin | Safi Khani | Sakdeh | Sakhteman-e Darvish Ghurak | Sakhteman-e Kahiyar Darreh Bid | Salarabad-e Chenar | Salehan | Sapu Sardar | Sar Asiab-e Ajam | Sar Asiab-e Karreh | Sar Asiab-e Landeh | Sar Asiab-e Yusefi | Sar Bisheh | Sar Bisheh-ye Olya | Sar Bisheh-ye Sofla | Sar Chaharmeh | Sar Chal | Sar Chenar | Sar Darreh | Sar Darreh | Sar Darreh-ye Bibi Roshteh | Sar Dasht-e Abdolreza | Sar Gach | Sar Ghol | Sar Khalun | Sar Khuni | Sar Kuraki-ye Deli Rich-e Olya | Sar Mur-e Kukhdan | Sar Par | Sar Peri | Sar Qanat-e Qobad Chenar | Sar Rash | Sar Sur | Sar Sureh | Sar Tang ol Majan | Sar Tang-e Bard Gadun | Sar Tang-e Deh Kohneh Hamidabad | Sar Tang-e Firuzabad | Sar Tang-e Mugarmun | Sar Tang-e Pivareh | Sar Tang-e Tut-e Nadeh | Sar Tirah | Sarab Biz | Sarab-e Khamzan-e Kuchek | Sarab-e Mugarm | Sarab-e Naniz | Sarab-e Taveh | Saran | Sarangab-e Boneh Pir | Saraskhaneh | Sarbas-e Olya | Sarbas-e Sofla | Sarchat-e Badhava | Sarcheshmeh-ye Mushemi | Sardasht-e Kalus | Sardow-ye Olya | Sardow-ye Sofla | Sarduk | Sar-e Mahur | Sargar Dangah | Sargar Kuh-e Panbeh | Sargar-e Lir Tahrak | Sargar-e Sasargun | Sargari Kalagh Khvordeh | Sargark | Sarhang | Sarkuh-e Shahid Deli Bajak | Sarkun-e Biseytun | Sarkur | Sarkuraki-ye Sefidar | Sarmast | Sarput-e Fartaq | Sarsar-e Rud Sameh | Sartal-e Abdarreh | Sartal-e Dingu | Sartal-e Melleh Gahar | Sartang-e Landeh | Sartang-e Lirab | Sartang-e Ravaq | Sartang-e Tang Sorkh | Sartang-e Tomanak | Sartangi | Sartaveh-ye Kabitollah | Sartuf Kat | Sartuf-e Delik | Sarvezg Darreh Bid | Savareh-ye Babakan | Savari | Sefidar-e Markazi | Seh Chah Gelal | Seh Godar | Seh Riz | Semerun | Senagun | Sendan Parah | Servak | Seyyed Mohammadbaqer | Seyyed Safi | Seyyed Saleh | Seyyedabad | Shadegan | Shah Bahram | Shah Ghaleb | Shah Mokhtar | Shah Neshin | Shah Vali | Shah Vali | Shah Vali | Shah Zeynali | Shahada-ye Deli Khomsir | Shahdali Edris | Shahdali Sib Ali | Shahid Delruz Bizhagan | Shahidabad-e Tang Seh Riz | Shahniz | Shahr Kheybonari-ye Fathi | Shahrak-e Gowd Band | Shahrak-e Kheyzan | Shahrak-e Paqalat | Shahrak-e Posht Gach | Shahrak-e Sadat Gach Boland | Shahrak-e Vali-ye Asr | Shahsavari | Shahzadeh Mohammad | Shali | Shambarakan | Shamsabad | Shams-e Arab | Sharab Goruh | Sherang Rang-e Murzard | Shesh Bard | Sheykh Habil | Sheykh Hoseyn | Sheykh Jan-e Bazkarbasi | Sheykh Khvajeh | Sheykh Sarkeh | Sheykhha | Shijuni-ye Saqaveh | Shilav Dun | Shirazi | Shiri | Shirini-ye Saqah | Shirkhan-e Tang Sepu | Shitab | Shorang Rang | Shotor Khun | Shum Shal | Shush-e Olya | Shush-e Sofla | Shutavar | Si Larestan-e Jowzar | Siah Shir | Sib-e Madab-e Sofla | Silab | Silarestan | Silarestan-e Olya Dam Ludab | Silarestan-e Sofla Dam Ludab | Sineh Namak | Sirun-e Shabliz | Sisakht | Siseh Garag-e Olya | Siseh Garag-e Sofla | Sivaki-ye Jalil | Sohrasnaji Mangezur | Soltanabad | Sorkhun | Sulak | Suq | Surmurd

=== T ===
Tagek | Tahalyun | Taksiseh-ye Olya | Taksiseh-ye Sofla | Takyeh | Tal Badam | Tal Bon Pereshkaft | Tal Gudaband | Talagah-e Olya | Talagah-e Sofla | Tal-e Chega | Tal-e Chegah | Tal-e Gavi | Tal-e Siyah-ye Bid Anjir | Taleh Zar-e Olya | Taleh Zar-e Sofla | Talgehi | Tali Shahi-ye Olya | Talkh Ab-e Ahmadzadeh | Talkhab-e Dishmuk | Talkhab-e Magher | Talkhab-e Olya | Talkhab-e Shirin | Talkhab-e Sofla Bidak | Talkhari-ye Abbas-e Deligerdu | Talkhari-ye Bandar-e Deligerdu | Talkhari-ye Dam-e Deligerdu | Talkheh Dan | Talkheh Dan-e Bozorg Amirabad | Talkheh Dan-e Jowkar | Talkheh Dan-e Olya | Talkheh Dan-e Run | Talkheh Zar | Talkheh Zar | Talkheh Zar-e Olya | Talkheh Zar-e Sofla | Tall Babineh | Tall Khani-ye Kakan | Tall Khosrow | Tall Margh | Tall Movizi | Tall Rezaqoli Mambi | Tall Seyyed Fakhr Ahmad | Tall Zari | Tall-e Deraz | Tall-e Ganj Gah | Tall-e Qaleh-ye Mugarmun | Tall-e Quchan | Tall-e Siah | Tall-e Siah-ye Ludab | Tamanak-e Olya | Tamanak-e Sofla | Tamdari | Tang Asiab-e Ajam | Tang Bustan Zizi | Tang Ravaq | Tang Ris | Tang Rud Zizi | Tang Sorkh Gendarmerie | Tang Zard-e Gelal | Tangab-e Sardar | Tangab-e Shur | Tangab-e Shush | Tangari | Tang-e Abdal | Tang-e Algher | Tang-e Anar-e Olya | Tang-e Anar-e Sofla | Tang-e Anar-e Vosta | Tang-e Anjir-e Dishmuk | Tang-e Bibi Jun | Tang-e Gur | Tang-e Gurdalu-ye Dishmuk | Tang-e Hamgun | Tang-e Khoshk | Tang-e Kolajiki Tahalyun | Tang-e Kushk | Tang-e Kuzi | Tang-e Mahlab-e Mahtab | Tang-e Moshkan | Tang-e Putak | Tang-e Sahteh | Tang-e Sorkh | Tang-e Sukhteh-ye Lirab | Tang-e Sulak | Tang-e Tey | Tang-e Zard-e Ashura | Tanguleh-ye Anjir | Tank Alak | Tarakak | Tarob | Tasuj-e Olya | Taveh Badom | Taveh Espid | Ti Maj | Tirabgun | Tirdari | Tol-e Kuchak Khiarkar | Tolvandi | Tomanak-e Olya | Tomanak-e Sofla | Tombi | Torab-e Olya | Torab-e Sofla | Torab-e Vosta | Tubardi | Tuf Darreh Bid | Tuf Fazel Tahalyun | Tuf Kheymeh | Tugabri | Tulian | Tut-e Nadeh

=== V ===
Vaghemi | Vahdatabad-e Mugarmun | Valiabad-e Deli Khomsir | Valihoseyn | Var Jafari-ye Gachi | Vargard | Vazgestan | Vezg-e Mansurabad

=== Y ===
Yasuj | Yusefabad-e Mokhtar

=== Z ===
Zafartehalayi | Zangavai-ye Olya | Zarangoli Run | Zardak | Zardkhani | Zarghamabad | Zarrin Dowtu | Zetin-e Olya | Zetin-e Sofla | Zir Deh-e Qanat Bahram Beygi | Zir Kal | Zir Kamar | Zir-e Tut | Zirkuh | Zirna | Zirnaseh-ye Zizi | Zirnay-e Olya | Zirnay-e Sofla | Zizi | Zu ol Faqari | Zur Azema
