= Deh-e Ebrahim, Kohgiluyeh and Boyer-Ahmad =

Deh-e Ebrahim ده ابراهيم
- Village
- Location within Iran
- Coordinates: 30°53′43″N 50°36′06″E
- Country: Iran
- Province: Kohgiluyeh and Boyer-Ahmad
- County: Kohgiluyeh
- Bakhsh: Central
- Rural District: Dehdasht-e Sharqi

Population (2006)
  - Total: 118
- Time zone: UTC+3:30 (IRST)
  - Summer (DST): UTC+4:30 (IRDT)

Deh-e Ebrahim (Persian: ده ابراهيم, also Romanized as Deh-e Ebrāhīm) is a village in Dehdasht-e Sharqi Rural District, in the Central District of Kohgiluyeh County, Kohgiluyeh and Boyer-Ahmad Province, Iran. At the 2006 census, its population was 118, in 21 families.
