= Bibi Zoleykhai =

Bibi Zoleykhai بي بي زليخائي
- Village
- Location within Iran
- Coordinates: 30°55′16″N 50°23′45″E
- Country: Iran
- Province: Kohgiluyeh and Boyer-Ahmad
- County: Kohgiluyeh
- Bakhsh: Central
- Rural District: Tayebi-ye Garmsiri-ye Jonubi

Population (2006)
  - Total: 237
- Time zone: UTC+3:30 (IRST)
  - Summer (DST): UTC+4:30 (IRDT)

Bibi Zoleykhai (Persian: بي بي زليخائي, also Romanized as Bībī Zoleykhā’ī; also known as Bībī Zoleykhānī, Qal‘eh-i-Mulla Qāsim, and Qal‘eh-ye Mollā Qāsem) is a village in Tayebi-ye Garmsiri-ye Jonubi Rural District, in the Central District of Kohgiluyeh County, Kohgiluyeh and Boyer-Ahmad Province, Iran. At the 2006 census, its population was 237, in 35 families.
