= Tall Khani-ye Kakan =

Village in Kohgiluyeh and Boyer-Ahmad, Iran

Tall Khani-ye Kakan تل خالي كاكان
- Village
- Location within Iran
- Coordinates: 30°36′05″N 51°51′30″E
- Country: Iran
- Province: Kohgiluyeh and Boyer-Ahmad
- County: Boyer-Ahmad
- Bakhsh: Central
- Rural District: Kakan

Population (2006)
  - Total: 15
- Time zone: UTC+3:30 (IRST)
  - Summer (DST): UTC+4:30 (IRDT)

Tall Khani-ye Kakan (Persian: تل خالي كاكان, also Romanized as Tall Khānī-ye Kākān; also known as Tall Khālī and Tall Khānī) is a village in Kakan Rural District, in the Central District of Boyer-Ahmad County, Kohgiluyeh and Boyer-Ahmad Province, Iran. At the 2006 census, its population was 15, in 4 families.
