= Cheshmeh Khersi Pirvezg =

Cheshmeh Khersi Pirvezg چشمه خرسي پيروزگ
- Village
- Location within Iran
- Coordinates: 30°41′32″N 51°23′44″E
- Country: Iran
- Province: Kohgiluyeh and Boyer-Ahmad
- County: Boyer-Ahmad
- Bakhsh: Central
- Rural District: Dasht-e Rum

Population (2006)
  - Total: 47
- Time zone: UTC+3:30 (IRST)
  - Summer (DST): UTC+4:30 (IRDT)

Cheshmeh Khersi Pirvezg (Persian: چشمه خرسي پيروزگ, also Romanized as Cheshmeh Khersī Pīrvezg; also known as Cheshmeh Khersī) is a village in Dasht-e Rum Rural District, in the Central District of Boyer-Ahmad County, Kohgiluyeh and Boyer-Ahmad Province, Iran. At the 2006 census, its population was 47, in 10 families.
