= Kanjed Zar =

Kanjed Zar كنجدزار
- Village
- Location within Iran
- Coordinates: 31°02′37″N 50°34′17″E
- Country: Iran
- Province: Kohgiluyeh and Boyer-Ahmad
- County: Kohgiluyeh
- Bakhsh: Central
- Rural District: Doshman Ziari

Population (2006)
  - Total: 134
- Time zone: UTC+3:30 (IRST)
  - Summer (DST): UTC+4:30 (IRDT)

Kanjed Zar (Persian: كنجدزار, also Romanized as Kanjed Zār; also known as Kanjeh Zār) is a village in Doshman Ziari Rural District, in the Central District of Kohgiluyeh County, Kohgiluyeh and Boyer-Ahmad Province, Iran. At the 2006 census, its population was 134, in 29 families.
