= Pazanan-e Deh Chel =

Pazanan-e Deh Chel پازنان ده چل
- Village
- Location within Iran
- Coordinates: 31°03′33″N 50°34′25″E
- Country: Iran
- Province: Kohgiluyeh and Boyer-Ahmad
- County: Kohgiluyeh
- Bakhsh: Central
- Rural District: Doshman Ziari

Population (2006)
  - Total: 133
- Time zone: UTC+3:30 (IRST)
  - Summer (DST): UTC+4:30 (IRDT)

Pazanan-e Deh Chel (Persian: پازنان ده چل, also Romanized as Pāzanān-e Deh Chel; also known as Pāzanān) is a village in Doshman Ziari Rural District, in the Central District of Kohgiluyeh County, Kohgiluyeh and Boyer-Ahmad Province, Iran. At the 2006 census, its population was 133, in 26 families.
