= Tahalyun =

Tahalyun تهليون
- Village
- Location within Iran
- Coordinates: 31°00′02″N 50°40′44″E
- Country: Iran
- Province: Kohgiluyeh and Boyer-Ahmad
- County: Boyer-Ahmad
- Bakhsh: Ludab
- Rural District: Chin

Population (2006)
  - Total: 159
- Time zone: UTC+3:30 (IRST)
  - Summer (DST): UTC+4:30 (IRDT)

Tahalyun (Persian: تهليون, also Romanized as Tahalyūn; also known as Tahaldūn and Talkhdān) is a village in Chin Rural District, Ludab District, Boyer-Ahmad County, Kohgiluyeh and Boyer-Ahmad Province, Iran. At the 2006 census, its population was 159, in 31 families.
