= Ab Darusheh-ye Chin =

Village in Kohgiluyeh and Boyer-Ahmad, Iran

Ab Darusheh-ye Chin ابدروشه چين
- Village
- Location within Iran
- Coordinates: 31°00′29″N 50°55′23″E
- Country: Iran
- Province: Kohgiluyeh and Boyer-Ahmad
- County: Boyer-Ahmad
- Bakhsh: Ludab
- Rural District: Chin

Population (2006)
  - Total: 107
- Time zone: UTC+3:30 (IRST)
  - Summer (DST): UTC+4:30 (IRDT)

Ab Darusheh-ye Chin (Persian: ابدروشه چين, also Romanized as Āb Darūsheh-ye Chīn; also known as Āb Darūsheh, Āb Dorūshak, and Āb-e Dorūsheh) is a village in Chin Rural District, Ludab District, Boyer-Ahmad County, Kohgiluyeh and Boyer-Ahmad Province, Iran. At the 2006 census, its population was 107, in 17 families.
