= Bimenjgan =

Bimenjgan بي منجگان
- Village
- Location within Iran
- Coordinates: 30°42′11″N 50°33′23″E
- Country: Iran
- Province: Kohgiluyeh and Boyer-Ahmad
- County: Kohgiluyeh
- Bakhsh: Central
- Rural District: Dehdasht-e Gharbi

Population (2006)
  - Total: 454
- Time zone: UTC+3:30 (IRST)
  - Summer (DST): UTC+4:30 (IRDT)

Bimenjgan (Persian: بي منجگان, also Romanized as Bīmenjgān and Bīmanjegan; also known as Bīd-e Manjegān, Qal‘eh-i-Bemingon, and Qal‘eh-ye Bemīn Gūn) is a village in Dehdasht-e Gharbi Rural District, in the Central District of Kohgiluyeh County, Kohgiluyeh and Boyer-Ahmad Province, Iran. At the 2006 census, its population was 454, in 93 families.
