= Rud-e Ayuk Dar Kheyari =

Rud-e Ayuk Dar Kheyari رودايوك دارخياري
- Village
- Location within Iran
- Coordinates: 31°16′07″N 50°16′52″E
- Country: Iran
- Province: Kohgiluyeh and Boyer-Ahmad
- County: Kohgiluyeh
- Bakhsh: Dishmok
- Rural District: Bahmayi-ye Sarhadi-ye Gharbi

Population (2006)
  - Total: 605
- Time zone: UTC+3:30 (IRST)
  - Summer (DST): UTC+4:30 (IRDT)

Rud-e Ayuk Dar Kheyari (Persian: رودايوك دارخياري, also Romanized as Rūd-e Ayūk Dār Kheyārī; also known as Rūd-e Ayūk and Rūd-e Ayyūk) is a village in Bahmayi-ye Sarhadi-ye Gharbi Rural District, Dishmok District, Kohgiluyeh County, Kohgiluyeh and Boyer-Ahmad Province, Iran. At the 2006 census, its population was 605, in 109 families.
