= Cheshmeh-ye Rashid Meleh Bahram Beygi =

Village in Kohgiluyeh and Boyer-Ahmad, Iran

Cheshmeh-ye Rashid Meleh Bahram Beygi چشمه رشيدمله بهرام بيگي
- Village
- Country: Iran
- Province: Kohgiluyeh and Boyer-Ahmad
- County: Boyer-Ahmad
- Bakhsh: Margown
- Rural District: Margown

Population (2006)
  - Total: 26
- Time zone: UTC+3:30 (IRST)
  - Summer (DST): UTC+4:30 (IRDT)

Cheshmeh-ye Rashid Meleh Bahram Beygi (Persian: چشمه رشيدمله بهرام بيگي, also Romanized as Cheshmeh-ye Rashīd Meleh Bahrām Beygī) is a village in Margown Rural District, Margown District, Boyer-Ahmad County, Kohgiluyeh and Boyer-Ahmad Province, Iran. At the 2006 census, its population was 26, in 4 families.
