= Sherang Rang-e Murzard =

Sherang Rang-e Murzard شرانگ رنگ مورزرد
- Village
- Location within Iran
- Coordinates: 31°15′21″N 50°45′10″E
- Country: Iran
- Province: Kohgiluyeh and Boyer-Ahmad
- County: Boyer-Ahmad
- Bakhsh: Margown
- Rural District: Margown

Population (2006)
  - Total: 90
- Time zone: UTC+3:30 (IRST)
  - Summer (DST): UTC+4:30 (IRDT)

Sherang Rang-e Murzard (Persian: شرانگ رنگ مورزرد, also Romanized as Sherāng Rang-e Mūrzard; also known as Sherang Rang) is a village in Margown Rural District, Margown District, Boyer-Ahmad County, Kohgiluyeh and Boyer-Ahmad Province, Iran. At the 2006 census, its population was 90, in 20 families.
