= Bal Rud =

Bal Rud بالرود
- Village
- Location within Iran
- Coordinates: 31°17′50″N 50°49′30″E
- Country: Iran
- Province: Kohgiluyeh and Boyer-Ahmad
- County: Boyer-Ahmad
- Bakhsh: Margown
- Rural District: Zilayi

Population (2006)
  - Total: 452
- Time zone: UTC+3:30 (IRST)
  - Summer (DST): UTC+4:30 (IRDT)

Bal Rud (Persian: بالرود, also Romanized as Bāl Rūd; also known as Bāl Rū) is a village in Zilayi Rural District, Margown District, Boyer-Ahmad County, Kohgiluyeh and Boyer-Ahmad Province, Iran. At the 2006 census, its population was 452, in 101 families.
