= Dintal-e Habibabad =

Dintal-e Habibabad دينتل حبيب اباد
- Village
- Location within Iran
- Coordinates: 30°44′11″N 51°31′38″E
- Country: Iran
- Province: Kohgiluyeh and Boyer-Ahmad
- County: Boyer-Ahmad
- Bakhsh: Central
- Rural District: Sarrud-e Shomali

Population (2006)
  - Total: 208
- Time zone: UTC+3:30 (IRST)
  - Summer (DST): UTC+4:30 (IRDT)

Dintal-e Habibabad (Persian: دينتل حبيب اباد, also Romanized as Dīntal-e Ḩabībābād; also known as Dīntal) is a village in Sarrud-e Shomali Rural District, in the Central District of Boyer-Ahmad County, Kohgiluyeh and Boyer-Ahmad Province, Iran. At the 2006 census, its population was 208, in 51 families.
