= Deh Sam-e Ludab =

Deh Sam-e Ludab ده سم لوداب
- Village
- Location within Iran
- Coordinates: 30°57′04″N 50°52′25″E
- Country: Iran
- Province: Kohgiluyeh and Boyer-Ahmad
- County: Boyer-Ahmad
- Bakhsh: Ludab
- Rural District: Ludab

Population (2006)
  - Total: 85
- Time zone: UTC+3:30 (IRST)
  - Summer (DST): UTC+4:30 (IRDT)

Deh Sam-e Ludab (Persian: ده سم لوداب, also Romanized as Deh Sam-e Lūdāb; also known as Deh-e Sam, Deh Sam, and Deh Som) is a village in Ludab Rural District, Ludab District, Boyer-Ahmad County, Kohgiluyeh and Boyer-Ahmad Province, Iran. At the 2006 census, its population was 85, in 16 families.
