= Chaghal =

Chaghal چغل
- Village
- Location within Iran
- Coordinates: 30°55′12″N 50°32′00″E
- Country: Iran
- Province: Kohgiluyeh and Boyer-Ahmad
- County: Kohgiluyeh
- Bakhsh: Central
- Rural District: Rak

Population (2006)
  - Total: 285
- Time zone: UTC+3:30 (IRST)
  - Summer (DST): UTC+4:30 (IRDT)

Chaghal (Persian: چغل, also Romanized as Choghal; also known as Chūghal) is a village in Rak Rural District, in the Central District of Kohgiluyeh County, Kohgiluyeh and Boyer-Ahmad Province, Iran. At the 2006 census, its population was 285, in 52 families.
