= Qalat-e Bar Aftab =

Qalat-e Bar Aftab قلات برافتاب
- Village
- Location within Iran
- Coordinates: 30°34′00″N 51°41′27″E
- Country: Iran
- Province: Kohgiluyeh and Boyer-Ahmad
- County: Boyer-Ahmad
- Bakhsh: Central
- Rural District: Sarrud-e Jonubi

Population (2006)
  - Total: 110
- Time zone: UTC+3:30 (IRST)
  - Summer (DST): UTC+4:30 (IRDT)

Qalat-e Bar Aftab (Persian: قلات برافتاب, also Romanized as Qalāt-e Bar Āftāb) is a village in Sarrud-e Jonubi Rural District, in the Central District of Boyer-Ahmad County, Kohgiluyeh and Boyer-Ahmad Province, Iran. At the 2006 census, its population was 110, in 24 families.
