= Barmeyun =

Barmeyun برميون
- Village
- Location within Iran
- Coordinates: 31°04′18″N 50°41′40″E
- Country: Iran
- Province: Kohgiluyeh and Boyer-Ahmad
- County: Boyer-Ahmad
- Bakhsh: Ludab
- Rural District: Ludab

Population (2006)
  - Total: 78
- Time zone: UTC+3:30 (IRST)
  - Summer (DST): UTC+4:30 (IRDT)

Barmeyun (Persian: برميون, also Romanized as Barmeyūn; also known as Barmīān) is a village in Ludab Rural District, Ludab District, Boyer-Ahmad County, Kohgiluyeh and Boyer-Ahmad Province, Iran. At the 2006 census, its population was 78, in 15 families.
