= Dar Ganji =

Dar Ganji دارگنجی
- Village
- Location within Iran
- Coordinates: 31°13′43″N 50°29′53″E
- Country: Iran
- Province: Kohgiluyeh and Boyer-Ahmad
- County: Kohgiluyeh
- Bakhsh: Charusa
- Rural District: Tayebi-ye Sarhadi-ye Gharbi

Population (2006)
  - Total: 179
- Time zone: UTC+3:30 (IRST)
  - Summer (DST): UTC+4:30 (IRDT)

Dar Ganji (Persian: دارگنجی, also Romanized as Dār Ganjī) is a village in Tayebi-ye Sarhadi-ye Gharbi Rural District, Charusa District, Kohgiluyeh County, Kohgiluyeh and Boyer-Ahmad Province, Iran. At the 2006 census, its population was 179, in 31 families.
