= Gardaneh-ye Chahar Murun-e Margown =

Gardaneh-ye Chahar Murun-e Margown گردنه چهارمورون مارگون
- Village
- Location within Iran
- Coordinates: 31°00′17″N 51°03′09″E
- Country: Iran
- Province: Kohgiluyeh and Boyer-Ahmad
- County: Boyer-Ahmad
- Bakhsh: Margown
- Rural District: Margown

Population (2006)
  - Total: 35
- Time zone: UTC+3:30 (IRST)
  - Summer (DST): UTC+4:30 (IRDT)

Gardaneh-ye Chahar Murun-e Margown (Persian: گردنه چهارمورون مارگون, also Romanized as Gardaneh-ye Chahār Mūrūn-e Mārgown; also known as Gardaneh-ye Chahār Mūrūn) is a village in Margown Rural District, Margown District, Boyer-Ahmad County, Kohgiluyeh and Boyer-Ahmad Province, Iran. At the 2006 census, its population was 35, in 5 families.
