= Ab Ti-ye Mahtab =

Ab Ti-ye Mahtab اب تي مهتاب
- Village
- Location within Iran
- Coordinates: 31°12′10″N 50°37′56″E
- Country: Iran
- Province: Kohgiluyeh and Boyer-Ahmad
- County: Kohgiluyeh
- Bakhsh: Charusa
- Rural District: Tayebi-ye Sarhadi-ye Sharqi

Population (2006)
  - Total: 17
- Time zone: UTC+3:30 (IRST)
  - Summer (DST): UTC+4:30 (IRDT)

Ab Ti-ye Mahtab (Persian: اب تي مهتاب, also Romanized as Āb Tī-ye Mahtāb; also known as Āb Tī) is a village in Tayebi-ye Sarhadi-ye Sharqi Rural District, Charusa District, Kohgiluyeh County, Kohgiluyeh and Boyer-Ahmad province, Iran. At the 2006 census, its population was 17, in 5 families.
