= Cheshmeh-ye Gari Deli Gerdu =

Cheshmeh-ye Gari Deli Gerdu چشمه گري دلي گردو
- Village
- Location within Iran
- Coordinates: 31°05′51″N 51°00′16″E
- Country: Iran
- Province: Kohgiluyeh and Boyer-Ahmad
- County: Boyer-Ahmad
- Bakhsh: Margown
- Rural District: Margown

Population (2006)
  - Total: 25
- Time zone: UTC+3:30 (IRST)
  - Summer (DST): UTC+4:30 (IRDT)

Cheshmeh-ye Gari Deli Gerdu (Persian: چشمه گري دلي گردو, also Romanized as Cheshmeh-ye Garī Delī Gerdū; also known as Cheshmeh-ye Garī) is a village in Margown Rural District, Margown District, Boyer-Ahmad County, Kohgiluyeh and Boyer-Ahmad Province, Iran. At the 2006 census, its population was 25, in 6 families.
