= Cheshmeh-ye Mohammad Beygi Dam Run =

Village in Kohgiluyeh and Boyer-Ahmad, Iran

Cheshmeh-ye Mohammad Beygi Dam Run Persian: چشمه محمدبيگي دم رون
- Village
- Country: Iran
- Province: Kohgiluyeh and Boyer-Ahmad Province
- County: Boyer-Ahmad County
- District: Margown Rural District

Population (2006)
  - Total: 29
- Time zone: UTC+3:30 (IRST)
  - Summer (DST): UTC+4:30 (IRDT)

Cheshmeh-ye Mohammad Beygi Dam Run (Persian: چشمه محمدبيگي دم رون, also Romanized as Cheshmeh-ye Moḩammad Beygī Dam Rūn) is a village in Margown Rural District, Margown District, Boyer-Ahmad County, Kohgiluyeh and Boyer-Ahmad Province, Iran. At the 2006 census, its population was 29, in 4 families.
