= Ab Balut-e Bonari =

Ab Balut-e Bonari اب بلوطبناري
- Village
- Country: Iran
- Province: Kohgiluyeh and Boyer-Ahmad
- County: Kohgiluyeh
- Bakhsh: Charusa
- Rural District: Tayebi-ye Sarhadi-ye Gharbi

Population (2006)
  - Total: 34
- Time zone: UTC+3:30 (IRST)
  - Summer (DST): UTC+4:30 (IRDT)

Ab Balut-e Bonari (Persian: اب بلوطبناري, also Romanized as Āb Balūṭ-e Bonārī) is a village in Tayebi-ye Sarhadi-ye Gharbi Rural District, Charusa District, Kohgiluyeh County, Kohgiluyeh and Boyer-Ahmad province, Iran. According to the 2006 census, it had a population of 34 in 6 families.
