= Deh-e Zu ol Faqar Sarperi =

Deh-e Zu ol Faqar Sarperi ده ذوالفقارسرپري
- Village
- Country: Iran
- Province: Kohgiluyeh and Boyer-Ahmad
- County: Kohgiluyeh
- Bakhsh: Central
- Rural District: Dehdasht-e Gharbi

Population (2006)
  - Total: 39
- Time zone: UTC+3:30 (IRST)
  - Summer (DST): UTC+4:30 (IRDT)

Deh-e Zu ol Faqar Sarperi (Persian: ده ذوالفقارسرپري, also Romanized as Deh-e Z̄ū ol Faqār Sarperī) is a village in Dehdasht-e Gharbi Rural District, in the Central District of Kohgiluyeh County, Kohgiluyeh and Boyer-Ahmad Province, Iran. At the 2006 census, its population was 39, in 7 families.
