= Do Bandab Chati-ye Mahtab =

Do Bandab Chati-ye Mahtab دوبنداب چاتي مهتاب
- Village
- Country: Iran
- Province: Kohgiluyeh and Boyer-Ahmad
- County: Kohgiluyeh
- Bakhsh: Charusa
- Rural District: Tayebi-ye Sarhadi-ye Sharqi

Population (2006)
  - Total: 22
- Time zone: UTC+3:30 (IRST)
  - Summer (DST): UTC+4:30 (IRDT)

Do Bandab Chati-ye Mahtab (Persian: دوبنداب چاتي مهتاب, also Romanized as Do Bandāb Chātī-ye Mahtāb) is a village in Tayebi-ye Sarhadi-ye Sharqi Rural District, Charusa District, Kohgiluyeh County, Kohgiluyeh and Boyer-Ahmad Province, Iran. At the 2006 census, its population was 22, in 5 families.
