= Chitaveh-ye Pereshkaft =

Chitaveh-ye Pereshkaft چيتاوه پراشكفت
- Village
- Location within Iran
- Coordinates: 30°43′07″N 51°17′19″E
- Country: Iran
- Province: Kohgiluyeh and Boyer-Ahmad
- County: Boyer-Ahmad
- Bakhsh: Central
- Rural District: Dasht-e Rum

Population (2006)
  - Total: 77
- Time zone: UTC+3:30 (IRST)
  - Summer (DST): UTC+4:30 (IRDT)

Chitaveh-ye Pereshkaft (Persian: چيتاوه پراشكفت, also Romanized as Chītāveh-ye Pereshkaft; also known as Chītāveh) is a village in Dasht-e Rum Rural District, in the Central District of Boyer-Ahmad County, Kohgiluyeh and Boyer-Ahmad Province, Iran. At the 2006 census, its population was 77, in 22 families.
