= Chal Baghcheh-ye Zilayi =

Chal Baghcheh-ye Zilayi چال باغچه زيلايي
- Village
- Location within Iran
- Coordinates: 31°23′40″N 50°38′54″E
- Country: Iran
- Province: Kohgiluyeh and Boyer-Ahmad
- County: Boyer-Ahmad
- Bakhsh: Margown
- Rural District: Zilayi

Population (2006)
  - Total: 230
- Time zone: UTC+3:30 (IRST)
  - Summer (DST): UTC+4:30 (IRDT)

Chal Baghcheh-ye Zilayi (Persian: چال باغچه زيلايي, also Romanized as Chāl Bāghcheh-ye Zīlāyī; also known as Chalbaghcheh) is a village in Zilayi Rural District, Margown District, Boyer-Ahmad County, Kohgiluyeh and Boyer-Ahmad Province, Iran. At the 2006 census, its population was 230, in 45 families.
