= Dam Saqaveh-ye Aziz =

Village in Kohgiluyeh and Boyer-Ahmad, Iran

Dam Saqaveh-ye Aziz دم سقاوه عزيز
- Village
- Location within Iran
- Coordinates: 30°58′55″N 51°03′50″E
- Country: Iran
- Province: Kohgiluyeh and Boyer-Ahmad
- County: Boyer-Ahmad
- Bakhsh: Margown
- Rural District: Margown

Population (2006)
  - Total: 47
- Time zone: UTC+3:30 (IRST)
  - Summer (DST): UTC+4:30 (IRDT)

Dam Saqaveh-ye Aziz (Persian: دم سقاوه عزيز, also Romanized as Dam Saqāveh-ye ʿAzīz; also known as Dam Saqāveh) is a village in Margown Rural District, Margown District, Boyer-Ahmad County, Kohgiluyeh and Boyer-Ahmad Province, Iran. At the 2006 census, its population was 47, in 8 families.
