= Mazeh Kharideh =

Mazeh Kharideh مازه خريده
- Village
- Location within Iran
- Coordinates: 30°38′18″N 51°33′19″E
- Country: Iran
- Province: Kohgiluyeh and Boyer-Ahmad
- County: Boyer-Ahmad
- Bakhsh: Central
- Rural District: Sarrud-e Jonubi

Population (2006)
  - Total: 273
- Time zone: UTC+3:30 (IRST)
  - Summer (DST): UTC+4:30 (IRDT)

Mazeh Kharideh (Persian: مازه خريده, also Romanized as Māzeh Kharīdeh) is a village in Sarrud-e Jonubi Rural District, in the Central District of Boyer-Ahmad County, Kohgiluyeh and Boyer-Ahmad Province, Iran. At the 2006 census, its population was 273, in 53 families.
