= Deh Miridallah Rak =

Deh Miridallah Rak, Iran ده ميريداله راك
- Village
- Country: Iran
- Province: Kohgiluyeh and Boyer-Ahmad
- County: Kohgiluyeh
- Bakhsh: Central
- Rural District: Rak

Population (2006)
  - Total: 38
- Time zone: UTC+3:30 (IRST)
  - Summer (DST): UTC+4:30 (IRDT)

Deh Miridallah Rak (Persian: ده ميريداله راك, also Romanized as Deh Mīrīdāllah Rāk) is a village in Rak Rural District, in the Central District of Kohgiluyeh County, Kohgiluyeh and Boyer-Ahmad Province, Iran. At the 2006 census, its population was 38, in 7 families.
