= Sar Chaharmeh =

Sar Chaharmeh سرچهارمه
- Village
- Location within Iran
- Coordinates: 30°47′49″N 50°29′53″E
- Country: Iran
- Province: Kohgiluyeh and Boyer-Ahmad
- County: Kohgiluyeh
- Bakhsh: Central
- Rural District: Dehdasht-e Gharbi

Population (2006)
  - Total: 37
- Time zone: UTC+3:30 (IRST)
  - Summer (DST): UTC+4:30 (IRDT)

Sar Chaharmeh (Persian: سرچهارمه, also Romanized as Sar Chahārmeh) is a village in Dehdasht-e Gharbi Rural District, in the Central District of Kohgiluyeh County, Kohgiluyeh and Boyer-Ahmad Province, Iran. At the 2006 census, its population was 37, in 6 families.
