= Do Rizgan =

Do Rizgan دوريزگان
- Village
- Location within Iran
- Coordinates: 30°54′21″N 50°34′27″E
- Country: Iran
- Province: Kohgiluyeh and Boyer-Ahmad
- County: Kohgiluyeh
- Bakhsh: Central
- Rural District: Rak

Population (2006)
  - Total: 261
- Time zone: UTC+3:30 (IRST)
  - Summer (DST): UTC+4:30 (IRDT)

Do Rizgan (Persian: دوريزگان, also Romanized as Do Rīzgān; also known as Darbar Kūn, Dūrbozgān, and Dūrbozkān) is a village in Rak Rural District, in the Central District of Kohgiluyeh County, Kohgiluyeh and Boyer-Ahmad Province, Iran. At the 2006 census, its population was 261, in 54 families.
