= Emamzadeh Mir Salar Fartaq =

Emamzadeh Mir Salar Fartaq امامزاده ميرسالارفارتق
- Village
- Location within Iran
- Coordinates: 31°17′03″N 50°26′59″E
- Country: Iran
- Province: Kohgiluyeh and Boyer-Ahmad
- County: Kohgiluyeh
- Bakhsh: Dishmok
- Rural District: Bahmayi-ye Sarhadi-ye Sharqi

Population (2006)
  - Total: 310
- Time zone: UTC+3:30 (IRST)
  - Summer (DST): UTC+4:30 (IRDT)

Emamzadeh Mir Salar Fartaq (Persian: امامزاده ميرسالارفارتق, also Romanized as Emāmzādeh Mīr Sālār Fārtaq; also known as Emāmzādeh Mīr Sālār) is a village in Bahmayi-ye Sarhadi-ye Sharqi Rural District, Dishmok District, Kohgiluyeh County, Kohgiluyeh and Boyer-Ahmad Province, Iran. At the 2006 census, its population was 310, in 57 families.
