= Cham Murd =

Cham Murd چم مورد
- Village
- Location within Iran
- Coordinates: 31°04′00″N 50°33′56″E
- Country: Iran
- Province: Kohgiluyeh and Boyer-Ahmad
- County: Kohgiluyeh
- Bakhsh: Central
- Rural District: Doshman Ziari

Population (2006)
  - Total: 75
- Time zone: UTC+3:30 (IRST)
  - Summer (DST): UTC+4:30 (IRDT)

Cham Murd (Persian: چم مورد, also Romanized as Cham Mūrd) is a village in Doshman Ziari Rural District, in the Central District of Kohgiluyeh County, Kohgiluyeh and Boyer-Ahmad Province, Iran. At the 2006 census, its population was 75, in 13 families.
