= Bid Barzeh-ye Sefidar =

Bid Barzeh-ye Sefidar بيدبرزه سفيدار
- Village
- Location within Iran
- Coordinates: 30°33′55″N 51°24′29″E
- Country: Iran
- Province: Kohgiluyeh and Boyer-Ahmad
- County: Boyer-Ahmad
- Bakhsh: Central
- Rural District: Sepidar

Population (2006)
  - Total: 100
- Time zone: UTC+3:30 (IRST)
  - Summer (DST): UTC+4:30 (IRDT)

Bid Barzeh-ye Sefidar (Persian: بيدبرزه سفيدار, also Romanized as Bīd Barzeh-e Sefīdār; also known as Bīd Barzeh) is a village in Sepidar Rural District, in the Central District of Boyer-Ahmad County, Kohgiluyeh and Boyer-Ahmad Province, Iran. At the 2006 census, its population was 100, in 20 families.
