= Jowberiz =

Jowberiz جوبريز
- Village
- Location within Iran
- Coordinates: 31°01′53″N 51°02′13″E
- Country: Iran
- Province: Kohgiluyeh and Boyer-Ahmad
- County: Boyer-Ahmad
- Bakhsh: Margown
- Rural District: Margown

Population (2006)
  - Total: 597
- Time zone: UTC+3:30 (IRST)
  - Summer (DST): UTC+4:30 (IRDT)

Jowberiz (Persian: جوبريز, also Romanized as Jowberīz) is a village in Margown Rural District, Margown District, Boyer-Ahmad County, Kohgiluyeh and Boyer-Ahmad Province, Iran. At the 2006 census, its population was 597, in 107 families.
