= Biareh =

Biareh بياره
- Village
- Location within Iran
- Coordinates: 30°50′07″N 51°27′08″E
- Country: Iran
- Province: Kohgiluyeh and Boyer-Ahmad
- County: Dena
- Bakhsh: Central
- Rural District: Dena

Population (2006)
  - Total: 382
- Time zone: UTC+3:30 (IRST)
  - Summer (DST): UTC+4:30 (IRDT)

Biareh (Persian: بياره, also Romanized as Bīāreh, Beyāreh, and Bīyāreh; also known as Beyāre) is a village in Dena Rural District, in the Central District of Dena County, Kohgiluyeh and Boyer-Ahmad Province, Iran. At the 2006 census, its population was 382, in 106 families.
