= Dasht-e Mazeh =

Dasht-e Mazeh دشت مازه
- Village
- Location within Iran
- Coordinates: 30°51′46″N 50°33′31″E
- Country: Iran
- Province: Kohgiluyeh and Boyer-Ahmad
- County: Kohgiluyeh
- Bakhsh: Central
- Rural District: Rak

Population (2006)
  - Total: 328
- Time zone: UTC+3:30 (IRST)
  - Summer (DST): UTC+4:30 (IRDT)

Dasht-e Mazeh (Persian: دشت مازه, also Romanized as Dasht-e Māzeh) is a village in Rak Rural District, in the Central District of Kohgiluyeh County, Kohgiluyeh and Boyer-Ahmad Province, Iran. At the 2006 census, its population was 328, in 63 families.
