= Barqulong-e Bajuli =

Barqulong-e Bajuli برقولنگ باجولي
- Village
- Location within Iran
- Coordinates: 30°29′45″N 51°24′22″E
- Country: Iran
- Province: Kohgiluyeh and Boyer-Ahmad
- County: Boyer-Ahmad
- Bakhsh: Central
- Rural District: Sepidar

Population (2006)
  - Total: 54
- Time zone: UTC+3:30 (IRST)
  - Summer (DST): UTC+4:30 (IRDT)

Barqulong-e Bajuli (Persian: برقولنگ باجولي, also Romanized as Barqūlong-e Bājūlī; also known as Bardqolong and Barqolong) is a village in Sepidar Rural District, in the Central District of Boyer-Ahmad County, Kohgiluyeh and Boyer-Ahmad Province, Iran. At the 2006 census, its population was 54, in 14 families.
