= Pas Chat Delik =

Pas Chat Delik پس چات دليك
- Village
- Location within Iran
- Coordinates: 31°02′16″N 50°39′06″E
- Country: Iran
- Province: Kohgiluyeh and Boyer-Ahmad
- County: Kohgiluyeh
- Bakhsh: Central
- Rural District: Doshman Ziari

Population (2006)
  - Total: 39
- Time zone: UTC+3:30 (IRST)
  - Summer (DST): UTC+4:30 (IRDT)

Pas Chat Delik (Persian: پس چات دليك, also Romanized as Pas Chāt Delīk; also known as Pas Chāt) is a village in Doshman Ziari Rural District, in the Central District of Kohgiluyeh County, Kohgiluyeh and Boyer-Ahmad Province, Iran. At the 2006 census, its population was 39, in 6 families.
