= Liseh Dar Gonji =

Liseh Dar Gonji ليسه دارگنجي
- Village
- Location within Iran
- Coordinates: 31°14′07″N 50°31′06″E
- Country: Iran
- Province: Kohgiluyeh and Boyer-Ahmad
- County: Kohgiluyeh
- Bakhsh: Charusa
- Rural District: Tayebi-ye Sarhadi-ye Gharbi

Population (2006)
  - Total: 30
- Time zone: UTC+3:30 (IRST)
  - Summer (DST): UTC+4:30 (IRDT)

Liseh Dar Gonji (Persian: ليسه دارگنجي, also Romanized as Līseh Dār Gonjī; also known as Dār Gonjī) is a village in Tayebi-ye Sarhadi-ye Gharbi Rural District, Charusa District, Kohgiluyeh County, Kohgiluyeh and Boyer-Ahmad Province, Iran. At the 2006 census, its population was 30, in 4 families.
