= Bazarnag =

Bazarnag بازرنگ
- Village
- Country: Iran
- Province: Kohgiluyeh and Boyer-Ahmad
- County: Boyer-Ahmad
- Bakhsh: Central
- Rural District: Sarrud-e Jonubi

Population (2006)
  - Total: 84
- Time zone: UTC+3:30 (IRST)
  - Summer (DST): UTC+4:30 (IRDT)

Bazarnag (Persian: بازرنگ, also Romanized as Bāzarnag) is a village in Sarrud-e Jonubi Rural District, in the Central District of Boyer-Ahmad County, Kohgiluyeh and Boyer-Ahmad Province, Iran. At the 2006 census, its population was 84, in 15 families.
