= Derb-e Miyan Ab =

Derb-e Miyan Ab درب ميان اب
- Village
- Location within Iran
- Coordinates: 30°54′52″N 50°30′39″E
- Country: Iran
- Province: Kohgiluyeh and Boyer-Ahmad
- County: Kohgiluyeh
- Bakhsh: Central
- Rural District: Rak

Population (2006)
  - Total: 46
- Time zone: UTC+3:30 (IRST)
  - Summer (DST): UTC+4:30 (IRDT)

Derb-e Miyan Ab (Persian: درب ميان اب, also Romanized as Derb-e Mīyān Āb; also known as Derb-e Mīyāb) is a village in Rak Rural District, in the Central District of Kohgiluyeh County, Kohgiluyeh and Boyer-Ahmad Province, Iran. At the 2006 census, its population was 46, in 8 families.
