= Lah Var Hoseyn-e Olya =

Village in Kohgiluyeh and Boyer-Ahmad, Iran

Lah Var Hoseyn-e Olya له وارحسين عليا
- Village
- Country: Iran
- Province: Kohgiluyeh and Boyer-Ahmad
- County: Boyer-Ahmad
- Bakhsh: Margown
- Rural District: Zilayi

Population (2006)
  - Total: 33
- Time zone: UTC+3:30 (IRST)
  - Summer (DST): UTC+4:30 (IRDT)

Lah Var Hoseyn-e Olya (Persian: له وارحسين عليا, also Romanized as Lah Vār Ḩoseyn-e ‘Olyā) is a village in Zilayi Rural District, Margown District, Boyer-Ahmad County, Kohgiluyeh and Boyer-Ahmad Province, Iran. At the 2006 census, its population was 33, in 6 families.
