= Darreh Khunbazi Dam-e Saqaveh =

Darreh Khunbazi Dam-e Saqaveh دره خونبازي دم سقاوه
- Village
- Country: Iran
- Province: Kohgiluyeh and Boyer-Ahmad
- County: Boyer-Ahmad
- Bakhsh: Margown
- Rural District: Margown

Population (2006)
  - Total: 20
- Time zone: UTC+3:30 (IRST)
  - Summer (DST): UTC+4:30 (IRDT)

Darreh Khunbazi Dam-e Saqaveh (Persian: دره خونبازي دم سقاوه, also Romanized as Darreh Khūnbāzī Dam-e Saqāveh) is a village in Margown Rural District, Margown District, Boyer-Ahmad County, Kohgiluyeh and Boyer-Ahmad Province, Iran. At the 2006 census, its population was 20, in 5 families.
