= Dameshkaft-e Kalat =

Dameshkaft-e Kalat دم اشكفت كلات
- Village
- Location within Iran
- Coordinates: 30°58′38″N 50°33′53″E
- Country: Iran
- Province: Kohgiluyeh and Boyer-Ahmad
- County: Kohgiluyeh
- Bakhsh: Central
- Rural District: Doshman Ziari

Population (2006)
  - Total: 151
- Time zone: UTC+3:30 (IRST)
  - Summer (DST): UTC+4:30 (IRDT)

Dameshkaft-e Kalat (Persian: دم اشكفت كلات, also Romanized as Dameshkaft-e Kalāt; also known as Dameshkaft) is a village in Doshman Ziari Rural District, in the Central District of Kohgiluyeh County, Kohgiluyeh and Boyer-Ahmad Province, Iran. At the 2006 census, its population was 151, in 30 families.
