= Dam Rud-e Ayuk Dar Kheyari =

Dam Rud-e Ayuk Dar Kheyari دم رودايوك دارخياري
- Village
- Country: Iran
- Province: Kohgiluyeh and Boyer-Ahmad
- County: Kohgiluyeh
- Bakhsh: Dishmok
- Rural District: Bahmayi-ye Sarhadi-ye Gharbi

Population (2006)
  - Total: 49
- Time zone: UTC+3:30 (IRST)
  - Summer (DST): UTC+4:30 (IRDT)

Dam Rud-e Ayuk Dar Kheyari (Persian: دم رودايوك دارخياري, also Romanized as Dam Rūd-e Ayūk Dār Kheyārī) is a village in Bahmayi-ye Sarhadi-ye Gharbi Rural District, Dishmok District, Kohgiluyeh County, Kohgiluyeh and Boyer-Ahmad Province, Iran. At the 2006 census, its population was 49, in 10 families.
