= Vargard =

Vargard ورگرد
- Village
- Location within Iran
- Coordinates: 31°14′12″N 50°23′43″E
- Country: Iran
- Province: Kohgiluyeh and Boyer-Ahmad
- County: Kohgiluyeh
- Bakhsh: Dishmok
- Rural District: Bahmayi-ye Sarhadi-ye Sharqi

Population (2006)
  - Total: 27
- Time zone: UTC+3:30 (IRST)
  - Summer (DST): UTC+4:30 (IRDT)

Vargard (Persian: ورگرد; also known as Vargar) is a village in Bahmayi-ye Sarhadi-ye Sharqi Rural District, Dishmok District, Kohgiluyeh County, Kohgiluyeh and Boyer-Ahmad Province, Iran. At the 2006 census, its population was 27, in 4 families.
