= Tang-e Kolajiki Tahalyun =

Tang-e Kolajiki Tahalyun تنگ كلاجيكي تهليون
- Village
- Country: Iran
- Province: Kohgiluyeh and Boyer-Ahmad
- County: Boyer-Ahmad
- Bakhsh: Ludab
- Rural District: Chin

Population (2006)
  - Total: 69
- Time zone: UTC+3:30 (IRST)

Tang-e Kolajiki Tahalyun (Persian: تنگ كلاجيكي تهليون, also Romanized as Tang-e Kolājīkī Tahalyūn) is a village in Chin Rural District, Ludab District, Boyer-Ahmad County, Kohgiluyeh and Boyer-Ahmad Province, Iran. In the 2006 census, its population was 69 people across 14 families.
