= Deh Naseh-ye Mazkur Gelal =

Deh Naseh-ye Mazkur Gelal ده نسه مذكورگلال
- Village
- Country: Iran
- Province: Kohgiluyeh and Boyer-Ahmad
- County: Boyer-Ahmad
- Bakhsh: Ludab
- Rural District: Chin

Population (2006)
  - Total: 20
- Time zone: UTC+3:30 (IRST)
  - Summer (DST): UTC+4:30 (IRDT)

Deh Naseh-ye Mazkur Gelal (Persian: ده نسه مذكورگلال, also Romanized as Deh Naseh-ye Maẕkūr Gelāl) is a village in Chin Rural District, Ludab District, Boyer-Ahmad County, Kohgiluyeh and Boyer-Ahmad Province, Iran. At the 2006 census, its population was 20, in 4 families.
