= Duruh =

Duruh دوروه
- Village
- Country: Iran
- Province: Kohgiluyeh and Boyer-Ahmad
- County: Boyer-Ahmad
- Bakhsh: Central
- Rural District: Sepidar

Population (2006)
  - Total: 32
- Time zone: UTC+3:30 (IRST)
  - Summer (DST): UTC+4:30 (IRDT)

Duruh (Persian: دوروه, also Romanized as Dūrūh) is a village in Sepidar Rural District, in the Central District of Boyer-Ahmad County, Kohgiluyeh and Boyer-Ahmad Province, Iran. At the 2006 census, its population was 32, in 6 families.

== Latitude and Longitude ==
The Latitude of Duruh is: 32.28513

The Longitude of Duruh is: 60.49189
