= Narehgah-e Markazi =

Narehgah-e Markazi نره گاه مركزي
- Village
- Location within Iran
- Coordinates: 30°37′02″N 51°34′01″E
- Country: Iran
- Province: Kohgiluyeh and Boyer-Ahmad
- County: Boyer-Ahmad
- Bakhsh: Central
- Rural District: Sarrud-e Jonubi

Population (2006)
  - Total: 1,104
- Time zone: UTC+3:30 (IRST)
  - Summer (DST): UTC+4:30 (IRDT)

Narehgah-e Markazi (Persian: نره گاه مركزي, also Romanized as Narehgāh-e Markazī; also known as Narehgāh, Nargāh, and Narrehgāh) is a village in Sarrud-e Jonubi Rural District, in the Central District of Boyer-Ahmad County, Kohgiluyeh and Boyer-Ahmad Province, Iran. At the 2006 census, its population was 1,104, in 212 families.
