= Badam Gerdaki =

Badam Gerdaki بادام گردكي
- Village
- Location within Iran
- Coordinates: 31°08′55″N 50°35′59″E
- Country: Iran
- Province: Kohgiluyeh and Boyer-Ahmad
- County: Kohgiluyeh
- Bakhsh: Charusa
- Rural District: Tayebi-ye Sarhadi-ye Sharqi

Population (2006)
  - Total: 60
- Time zone: UTC+3:30 (IRST)
  - Summer (DST): UTC+4:30 (IRDT)

Badam Gerdaki (Persian: بادام گردكي, also Romanized as Bādām Gerdakī) is a village in Tayebi-ye Sarhadi-ye Sharqi Rural District, Charusa District, Kohgiluyeh County, Kohgiluyeh and Boyer-Ahmad Province, Iran. At the 2006 census, its population was 60, in 9 families.
