= Sib-e Madab-e Sofla =

Sib-e Madab-e Sofla سيب مداب سفلي
- Village
- Location within Iran
- Coordinates: 30°38′00″N 51°39′00″E
- Country: Iran
- Province: Kohgiluyeh and Boyer-Ahmad
- County: Boyer-Ahmad
- Bakhsh: Central
- Rural District: Sarrud-e Shomali

Population (2006)
  - Total: 25
- Time zone: UTC+3:30 (IRST)
  - Summer (DST): UTC+4:30 (IRDT)

Sib-e Madab-e Sofla (Persian: سيب مداب سفلي, also Romanized as Sīb-e Madāb-e Soflá; also known as Sīb-e Madāb) is a village in Sarrud-e Shomali Rural District, located in the Central District of Boyer-Ahmad County, Kohgiluyeh and Boyer-Ahmad Province, Iran. According to the 2006 census, it had a population of 25 people, comprising 5 families.
