= Askan Ashayir Deli Bajak =

Askan Ashayir Deli Bajak اسكان عشايردلي بجك
- Village
- Country: Iran
- Province: Kohgiluyeh and Boyer-Ahmad
- County: Boyer-Ahmad
- Bakhsh: Central
- Rural District: Sepidar

Population (2006)
  - Total: 128
- Time zone: UTC+3:30 (IRST)
  - Summer (DST): UTC+4:30 (IRDT)

Askan Ashayir Deli Bajak (Persian: اسكان عشايردلي بجك, also Romanized as Sskān ʿAshāyīr Delī Bajak) is a village in Sepidar Rural District, in the Central District of Boyer-Ahmad County, Kohgiluyeh and Boyer-Ahmad Province, Iran. At the 2006 census, its population was 128, in 26 families.
