= Tank Alak =

Tank Alak تنك الك
- Village
- Location within Iran
- Coordinates: 31°04′24″N 50°51′44″E
- Country: Iran
- Province: Kohgiluyeh and Boyer-Ahmad
- County: Boyer-Ahmad
- Bakhsh: Ludab
- Rural District: Chin

Population (2006)
  - Total: 160
- Time zone: UTC+3:30 (IRST)
  - Summer (DST): UTC+4:30 (IRDT)

Tank Alak (Persian: تنك الك, also Romanized as Tang Ālak and Tang-e Ālak) is a village in Chin Rural District, Ludab District, Boyer-Ahmad County, Kohgiluyeh and Boyer-Ahmad Province, Iran. At the 2006 census, its population was 160, in 32 families.
