= Deh Bardel-e Dam Saqaveh =

Deh Bardel-e Dam Saqaveh ده بردل دم سقاوه
- Village
- Country: Iran
- Province: Kohgiluyeh and Boyer-Ahmad
- County: Boyer-Ahmad
- Bakhsh: Margown
- Rural District: Margown

Population (2006)
  - Total: 11
- Time zone: UTC+3:30 (IRST)
  - Summer (DST): UTC+4:30 (IRDT)

Deh Bardel-e Dam Saqaveh (Persian: ده بردل دم سقاوه, also Romanized as Deh Bardel-e Dam Saqāveh) is a village in Margown Rural District, Margown District, Boyer-Ahmad County, Kohgiluyeh and Boyer-Ahmad Province, Iran. At the 2006 census, its population was 11, in 4 families.
