= Tang Ris =

Tang Ris تنگريس
- Village
- Location within Iran
- Coordinates: 31°05′53″N 50°52′47″E
- Country: Iran
- Province: Kohgiluyeh and Boyer-Ahmad
- County: Boyer-Ahmad
- Bakhsh: Margown
- Rural District: Margown

Population (2006)
  - Total: 62
- Time zone: UTC+3:30 (IRST)
  - Summer (DST): UTC+4:30 (IRDT)

Tang Ris (Persian: تنگريس, also Romanized as Tang Rīs; also known as Tang Rīz) is a village in Margown Rural District, Margown District, Boyer-Ahmad County, Kohgiluyeh and Boyer-Ahmad Province, Iran. At the 2006 census, its population was 62, in 15 families.
