= Bataveh-ye Najak =

Bataveh-ye Najak با تاوه ناجك
- Village
- Country: Iran
- Province: Kohgiluyeh and Boyer-Ahmad
- County: Kohgiluyeh
- Bakhsh: Charusa
- Rural District: Tayebi-ye Sarhadi-ye Sharqi

Population (2006)
  - Total: 109
- Time zone: UTC+3:30 (IRST)
  - Summer (DST): UTC+4:30 (IRDT)

Bataveh-ye Najak (Persian: با تاوه ناجك, also Romanized as Bātāveh-ye Nājak) is a village in Tayebi-ye Sarhadi-ye Sharqi Rural District, Charusa District, Kohgiluyeh County, Kohgiluyeh and Boyer-Ahmad Province, Iran. In a 2006 census, its population was 109, in 18 families.
