= Deh Qanat-e Charbiyun =

Deh Qanat-e Charbiyun ده قنات چربيون
- Village
- Country: Iran
- Province: Kohgiluyeh and Boyer-Ahmad
- County: Boyer-Ahmad
- Bakhsh: Margown
- Rural District: Zilayi

Population (2006)
  - Total: 27
- Time zone: UTC+3:30 (IRST)
  - Summer (DST): UTC+4:30 (IRDT)

Deh Qanat-e Charbiyun (Persian: ده قنات چربيون, also Romanized as Deh Qanāt-e Charbīyūn) is a village in Zilayi Rural District, Margown District, Boyer-Ahmad County, Kohgiluyeh and Boyer-Ahmad Province, Iran. At the 2006 census, its population was 27, in 5 families.
