= Chal Baniu Dasht Rum =

Chal Baniu Dasht Rum چال بنيودشت روم
- Village
- Location within Iran
- Coordinates: 30°31′21″N 51°33′30″E
- Country: Iran
- Province: Kohgiluyeh and Boyer-Ahmad
- County: Boyer-Ahmad
- Bakhsh: Central
- Rural District: Dasht-e Rum

Population (2006)
  - Total: 407
- Time zone: UTC+3:30 (IRST)
  - Summer (DST): UTC+4:30 (IRDT)

Chal Baniu Dasht Rum (Persian: چال بنيودشت روم, also Romanized as Chāl Banīū Dasht Rūm; also known as Chāl Banīū) is a village in Dasht-e Rum Rural District, in the Central District of Boyer-Ahmad County, Kohgiluyeh and Boyer-Ahmad Province, Iran. At the 2006 census, its population was 407, in 76 families.
