= Gav Barg =

Gav Barg گاوبرگ
- Village
- Location within Iran
- Coordinates: 30°26′42″N 51°29′49″E
- Country: Iran
- Province: Kohgiluyeh and Boyer-Ahmad
- County: Boyer-Ahmad
- Bakhsh: Central
- Rural District: Dasht-e Rum

Population (2006)
  - Total: 101
- Time zone: UTC+3:30 (IRST)
  - Summer (DST): UTC+4:30 (IRDT)

Gav Barg (Persian: گاوبرگ, also Romanized as Gāv Barg; also known as Gāv Bark) is a village in Dasht-e Rum Rural District, in the Central District of Boyer-Ahmad County, Kohgiluyeh and Boyer-Ahmad Province, Iran.

== Census ==
At the 2006 census, its population was 101, in 24 families.
