= Ahmad Salar-e Kalat Tayebi =

Ahmad Salar-e Kalat Tayebi احمدسلاركلات طيبي
- Village
- Location within Iran
- Coordinates: 31°04′46″N 50°33′02″E
- Country: Iran
- Province: Kohgiluyeh and Boyer-Ahmad
- County: Kohgiluyeh
- Bakhsh: Charusa
- Rural District: Tayebi-ye Sarhadi-ye Sharqi

Population (2006)
  - Total: 166
- Time zone: UTC+3:30 (IRST)
  - Summer (DST): UTC+4:30 (IRDT)

Ahmad Salar-e Kalat Tayebi (Persian: احمدسلاركلات طيبي, also Romanized as Aḩmad Sālār-e Kalāt Ţayebī; also known as Aḩmad Sālār) is a village in Tayebi-ye Sarhadi-ye Sharqi Rural District, Charusa District, Kohgiluyeh County, Kohgiluyeh and Boyer-Ahmad Province, Iran. At the 2006 census, its population was 166, in 32 families.
