= Zardkhani =

Zardkhani زردخاني
- Village
- Location within Iran
- Coordinates: 30°35′34″N 51°48′14″E
- Country: Iran
- Province: Kohgiluyeh and Boyer-Ahmad
- County: Boyer-Ahmad
- Bakhsh: Central
- Rural District: Kakan

Population (2006)
  - Total: 143
- Time zone: UTC+3:30 (IRST)
  - Summer (DST): UTC+4:30 (IRDT)

Zardkhani (Persian: زردخاني, also Romanized as Zardkhānī) is a village in Kakan Rural District, in the Central District of Boyer-Ahmad County, Kohgiluyeh and Boyer-Ahmad Province, Iran. At the 2006 census, its population was 143, in 33 families.
