= Katuzar Murzard =

Katuzar Murzard كتوزارمورزرد
- Village
- Location within Iran
- Coordinates: 31°12′23″N 50°50′04″E
- Country: Iran
- Province: Kohgiluyeh and Boyer-Ahmad
- County: Boyer-Ahmad
- Bakhsh: Margown
- Rural District: Margown

Population (2006)
  - Total: 72
- Time zone: UTC+3:30 (IRST)
  - Summer (DST): UTC+4:30 (IRDT)

Katuzar Murzard (Persian: كتوزارمورزرد, also Romanized as Katūzār Mūrzard; also known as Katehzār) is a village in Margown Rural District, Margown District, Boyer-Ahmad County, Kohgiluyeh and Boyer-Ahmad Province, Iran. At the 2006 census, its population was 72, in 11 families.
