= Gol Zadini-ye Zirkal =

Village in Kohgiluyeh and Boyer-Ahmad, Iran

Gol Zadini-ye Zirkal گل زديني زيركل
- Village
- Location within Iran
- Coordinates: 31°04′49″N 50°32′31″E
- Country: Iran
- Province: Kohgiluyeh and Boyer-Ahmad
- County: Kohgiluyeh
- Bakhsh: Charusa
- Rural District: Tayebi-ye Sarhadi-ye Sharqi

Population (2006)
  - Total: 21
- Time zone: UTC+3:30 (IRST)
  - Summer (DST): UTC+4:30 (IRDT)

Gol Zadini-ye Zirkal (Persian: گل زديني زيركل, also Romanized as Gol Zadanī-ye Zīrkal; also known as Gol Zadanī) is a village in Tayebi-ye Sarhadi-ye Sharqi Rural District, Charusa District, Kohgiluyeh County, Kohgiluyeh and Boyer-Ahmad Province, Iran. At the 2006 census, its population was 21, in 6 families.
