= Pa Chong =

Pa Chong پاچنگ
- Village
- Location within Iran
- Coordinates: 31°01′01″N 50°35′26″E
- Country: Iran
- Province: Kohgiluyeh and Boyer-Ahmad
- County: Kohgiluyeh
- Bakhsh: Central
- Rural District: Doshman Ziari

Population (2006)
  - Total: 125
- Time zone: UTC+3:30 (IRST)
  - Summer (DST): UTC+4:30 (IRDT)

Pa Chong (Persian: پاچنگ, also Romanized as Pā Chong) is a village in Doshman Ziari Rural District, in the Central District of Kohgiluyeh County, Kohgiluyeh and Boyer-Ahmad Province, Iran. According to 2006 census, its population was 125, in 29 families.
