= Pas Chat Sharang Rang =

Pas Chat Sharang Rang پس چات شرانگ رنگ
- Village
- Country: Iran
- Province: Kohgiluyeh and Boyer-Ahmad
- County: Boyer-Ahmad
- Bakhsh: Margown
- Rural District: Margown

Population (2006)
  - Total: 24
- Time zone: UTC+3:30 (IRST)
  - Summer (DST): UTC+4:30 (IRDT)

Pas Chat Sharang Rang (Persian: پس چات شرانگ رنگ, also Romanized as Pas Chāt Sharāng Rang) is a village in Margown Rural District, Margown District, Boyer-Ahmad County, Kohgiluyeh and Boyer-Ahmad Province, Iran. At the 2006 census, its population was 24, in 6 families.
