= Deh-e Ramezan =

Deh-e Ramezan ده رمضان
- Village
- Location within Iran
- Coordinates: 30°53′44″N 50°35′47″E
- Country: Iran
- Province: Kohgiluyeh and Boyer-Ahmad
- County: Kohgiluyeh
- Bakhsh: Central
- Rural District: Dehdasht-e Sharqi

Population (2006)
  - Total: 77
- Time zone: UTC+3:30 (IRST)
  - Summer (DST): UTC+4:30 (IRDT)

Deh-e Ramezan (Persian: ده رمضان, also Romanized as Deh-e Ramez̤ān; also known as Dehramez̤ān) is a village in Dehdasht-e Sharqi Rural District, in the Central District of Kohgiluyeh County, Kohgiluyeh and Boyer-Ahmad Province, Iran. At the 2006 census, its population was 77, in 14 families.
