= Lal-e Mina =

Lal-e Mina لعل مينا
- Village
- Location within Iran
- Coordinates: 31°24′52″N 50°38′59″E
- Country: Iran
- Province: Kohgiluyeh and Boyer-Ahmad
- County: Boyer-Ahmad
- Bakhsh: Margown
- Rural District: Zilayi

Population (2006)
  - Total: 290
- Time zone: UTC+3:30 (IRST)
  - Summer (DST): UTC+4:30 (IRDT)

Lal-e Mina (Persian: لعل مينا, also Romanized as La‘l-e Mīnā; also known as La‘l-e Mīneh) is a village in Zilayi Rural District, Margown District, Boyer-Ahmad County, Kohgiluyeh and Boyer-Ahmad Province, Iran. At the 2006 census, its population was 290, in 63 families.
