= Puzeh-ye Kuhbord =

Puzeh-ye Kuhbord پوزه كوهبرد
- Village
- Location within Iran
- Coordinates: 30°43′42″N 50°33′05″E
- Country: Iran
- Province: Kohgiluyeh and Boyer-Ahmad
- County: Kohgiluyeh
- Bakhsh: Central
- Rural District: Dehdasht-e Gharbi

Population (2006)
  - Total: 86
- Time zone: UTC+3:30 (IRST)
  - Summer (DST): UTC+4:30 (IRDT)

Puzeh-ye Kuhbord (Persian: پوزه كوهبرد, also Romanized as Pūzeh-ye Kūhbord) is a village in Dehdasht-e Gharbi Rural District, in the Central District of Kohgiluyeh County, Kohgiluyeh and Boyer-Ahmad Province, Iran. In the 2006 census, its total population was 86, including 14 families.
