= Shahvali =

Shahvali or Shah Vali (Persian: شاه ولي) may refer to these places in Iran:

- Shah Vali, Kaleybar, East Azerbaijan Province
- Shah Vali, Khoda Afarin, East Azerbaijan Province
- Shah Vali, Bahmai, Kohgiluyeh and Boyer-Ahmad Province
- Shah Vali, Bahmai-ye Garmsiri, Bahmai County, Kohgiluyeh and Boyer-Ahmad Province
- Shah Vali, Kohgiluyeh, Kohgiluyeh and Boyer-Ahmad Province
- Shah Vali, Kermanshah
- Shah Vali, Masjed Soleyman, Khuzestan Province
- Shah Vali, Shadegan, Khuzestan Province
- Shah Vali, Kurdistan
- Shahvali, Lorestan
- Shah Vali, Lorestan

== See also ==
- Shah Waliullah (disambiguation)
- Shah Wali Khan (disambiguation)
