= Talkhehdan =

Talkhehdan or Talkheh Dan (Persian: تلخه دان) may refer to various places in Iran:

- Talkhehdan, Chaharmahal and Bakhtiari
- Talkheh Dan, Kohgiluyeh and Boyer-Ahmad
- Talkheh Dan-e Bozorg Amirabad, Kohgiluyeh and Boyer-Ahmad Province
- Talkheh Dan-e Jowkar, Kohgiluyeh and Boyer-Ahmad Province
- Talkheh Dan-e Olya, Kohgiluyeh and Boyer-Ahmad Province
- Talkheh Dan-e Run, Kohgiluyeh and Boyer-Ahmad Province
