= Sar Tuf =

Sar Tuf or Sartuf (Persian: سرتوف or سرطوف) may refer to:

- Sar Tuf, Khuzestan (سرتوف - Sar Tūf)
- Sartuf Kat, Kohgiluyeh and Boyer-Ahmad Province
- Sartuf-e Delik, Kohgiluyeh and Boyer-Ahmad Province
