= Qabr-e Qeysar =

Qabr-e Qeysar قبرقيصر
- Village
- Location within Iran
- Coordinates: 30°51′59″N 50°06′51″E
- Country: Iran
- Province: Kohgiluyeh and Boyer-Ahmad
- County: Bahmai
- Bakhsh: Central
- Rural District: Bahmai-ye Garmsiri-ye Jonubi

Population (2006)
  - Total: 295
- Time zone: UTC+3:30 (IRST)
  - Summer (DST): UTC+4:30 (IRDT)

Qabr-e Qeysar (Persian: قبرقيصر, also Romanized as Qabr-e Qeyşar) is a village in Bahmai-ye Garmsiri-ye Jonubi Rural District, in the Central District of Bahmai County, Kohgiluyeh and Boyer-Ahmad Province, Iran. At the 2006 census, its population was 295, in 43 families.
