= Khvosh Ab-e Shirin =

Khvosh Ab-e Shirin خوشاب شيرين
- Village
- Location within Iran
- Coordinates: 30°48′00″N 50°16′58″E
- Country: Iran
- Province: Kohgiluyeh and Boyer-Ahmad
- County: Bahmai
- Bakhsh: Central
- Rural District: Kafsh Kanan

Population (2006)
  - Total: 105
- Time zone: UTC+3:30 (IRST)
  - Summer (DST): UTC+4:30 (IRDT)

Khvosh Ab-e Shirin (Persian: خوشاب شيرين, also Romanized as Khvosh Āb-e Shīrīn, Khowsh Āb-e Shīrīn, and Khvoshāb-e Shīrīn; also known as Khvoshāb and Shīrīn) is a village in Kafsh Kanan Rural District, in the Central District of Bahmai County, Kohgiluyeh and Boyer-Ahmad Province, Iran. At the 2006 census, its population was 105, in 20 families.
