= Gaduk Boneh-ye Pir =

Village in Kohgiluyeh and Boyer-Ahmad, Iran

Gaduk Boneh-ye Pir گدوك بنه پير
- Village
- Location within Iran
- Coordinates: 31°10′42″N 50°03′14″E
- Country: Iran
- Province: Kohgiluyeh and Boyer-Ahmad
- County: Bahmai
- Bakhsh: Bahmai-ye Garmsiri
- Rural District: Bahmai-ye Garmsiri-ye Shomali

Population (2006)
  - Total: 56
- Time zone: UTC+3:30 (IRST)
  - Summer (DST): UTC+4:30 (IRDT)

Gaduk Boneh-ye Pir (Persian: گدوك بنه پير, also Romanized as Gadūk Boneh-ye Pīr; also known as Boneh Pīr and Boneh-ye Pīr) is a village in Bahmai-ye Garmsiri-ye Shomali Rural District, Bahmai-ye Garmsiri District, Bahmai County, Kohgiluyeh and Boyer-Ahmad Province, Iran. At the 2006 census, its population was 56, in 10 families.
