= Murun-e Pas Bagh =

Murun-e Pas Bagh مورون پس باغ
- Village
- Location within Iran
- Coordinates: 31°05′52″N 50°10′00″E
- Country: Iran
- Province: Kohgiluyeh and Boyer-Ahmad
- County: Bahmai
- Bakhsh: Bahmai-ye Garmsiri
- Rural District: Sar Asiab-e Yusefi

Population (2006)
  - Total: 150
- Time zone: UTC+3:30 (IRST)
  - Summer (DST): UTC+4:30 (IRDT)

Murun-e Pas Bagh (Persian: مورون پس باغ, also Romanized as Mūrūn-e Pas Bāgh; also known as Mūrān and Mūrūn) is a village in Sar Asiab-e Yusefi Rural District, Bahmai-ye Garmsiri District, Bahmai County, Kohgiluyeh and Boyer-Ahmad Province, Iran. At the 2006 census, its population was 150, in 34 families.
