= Parah-e Hirami =

Village in Kohgiluyeh and Boyer-Ahmad, Iran

Parah-e Hirami پاراه هيرمي
- Village
- Location within Iran
- Coordinates: 31°06′38″N 50°09′37″E
- Country: Iran
- Province: Kohgiluyeh and Boyer-Ahmad
- County: Bahmai
- Bakhsh: Bahmai-ye Garmsiri
- Rural District: Bahmai-ye Garmsiri-ye Shomali

Population (2006)
  - Total: 66
- Time zone: UTC+3:30 (IRST)
  - Summer (DST): UTC+4:30 (IRDT)

Parah-e Hirami (Persian: پاراه هيرمي, also Romanized as Pārāh-e Hīramī) is a village in Bahmai-ye Garmsiri-ye Shomali Rural District, Bahmai-ye Garmsiri District, Bahmai County, Kohgiluyeh and Boyer-Ahmad Province, Iran. At the 2006 census, its population was 66, in 15 families.
