= Bahmai-ye Garmsiri =

Bahmai-ye Garmsiri (Persian: بهمیی گرمسیری) may refer to:

- Bahmai-ye Garmsiri District
- Bahmai-ye Garmsiri-ye Jonubi Rural District
- Bahmai-ye Garmsiri-ye Shomali Rural District
