= Ab Behan =

Ab Behan ابهان
- Village
- Location within Iran
- Coordinates: 30°54′11″N 49°59′25″E
- Country: Iran
- Province: Kohgiluyeh and Boyer-Ahmad
- County: Bahmai
- Bakhsh: Central
- Rural District: Bahmai-ye Garmsiri-ye Jonubi

Population (2006)
  - Total: 21
- Time zone: UTC+3:30 (IRST)
  - Summer (DST): UTC+4:30 (IRDT)

Ab Behan (Persian: ابهان, also Romanized as Āb Behān; also known as Chashmeh-ye Āb Bāhūn and Cheshmeh-ye Āb Bāhūn) is a village in Bahmai-ye Garmsiri-ye Jonubi Rural District, in the Central District of Bahmai County, Kohgiluyeh and Boyer-Ahmad Province, Iran. At the 2006 census, its population was 21, in 5 families.
