= Ti Maj =

Village in Kohgiluyeh and Boyer-Ahmad, Iran

Ti Maj تيمج
- Village
- Location within Iran
- Coordinates: 31°09′04″N 50°05′46″E
- Country: Iran
- Province: Kohgiluyeh and Boyer-Ahmad
- County: Bahmai
- Bakhsh: Bahmai-ye Garmsiri
- Rural District: Bahmai-ye Garmsiri-ye Shomali

Population (2006)
  - Total: 34
- Time zone: UTC+3:30 (IRST)
  - Summer (DST): UTC+4:30 (IRDT)

Ti Maj (Persian: تيمج, also Romanized as Tī Maj) is a village in Bahmai-ye Garmsiri-ye Shomali Rural District, Bahmai-ye Garmsiri District, Bahmai County, Kohgiluyeh and Boyer-Ahmad Province, Iran. At the 2006 census, its population was 34, in 6 families.
