= Sar Khuni, Kohgiluyeh and Boyer-Ahmad =

Sar Khuni سرخوني
- Village
- Location within Iran
- Coordinates: 31°00′00″N 50°02′19″E
- Country: Iran
- Province: Kohgiluyeh and Boyer-Ahmad
- County: Bahmai
- Bakhsh: Central
- Rural District: Bahmai-ye Garmsiri-ye Jonubi

Population (2006)
  - Total: 37
- Time zone: UTC+3:30 (IRST)
  - Summer (DST): UTC+4:30 (IRDT)

Sar Khuni (Persian: سرخوني, also Romanized as Sar Khūnī) is a village in Bahmai-ye Garmsiri-ye Jonubi Rural District, in the Central District of Bahmai County, Kohgiluyeh and Boyer-Ahmad Province, Iran. At the 2006 census, its population was 37, in 8 families.
