= Mama Zeynab =

Mama Zeynab مامازينب
- Village
- Location within Iran
- Coordinates: 31°00′57″N 50°10′42″E
- Country: Iran
- Province: Kohgiluyeh and Boyer-Ahmad
- County: Bahmai
- Bakhsh: Bahmai-ye Garmsiri
- Rural District: Sar Asiab-e Yusefi

Population (2006)
  - Total: 321
- Time zone: UTC+3:30 (IRST)
  - Summer (DST): UTC+4:30 (IRDT)

Mama Zeynab (Persian: مامازينب, also Romanized as Māmā Zeynāb, Mama Zeinab and Māmā Zeynab; also known as Moḩammad Zeynab and Muhammad Zainab) is a village in Sar Asiab-e Yusefi Rural District, Bahmai-ye Garmsiri District, Bahmai County, Kohgiluyeh and Boyer-Ahmad Province, Iran. At the 2006 census, its population was 321, in 60 families.
