= Zur Azema =

Zur Azema زورازما
- Village
- Location within Iran
- Coordinates: 30°59′00″N 50°01′59″E
- Country: Iran
- Province: Kohgiluyeh and Boyer-Ahmad
- County: Bahmai
- Bakhsh: Central
- Rural District: Bahmai-ye Garmsiri-ye Jonubi

Population (2006)
  - Total: 190
- Time zone: UTC+3:30 (IRST)
  - Summer (DST): UTC+4:30 (IRDT)

Zur Azema (Persian: زورازما, also Romanized as Zūr Āzemā and Zūrāzemā) is a village in Bahmai-ye Garmsiri-ye Jonubi Rural District, in the Central District of Bahmai County, Kohgiluyeh and Boyer-Ahmad Province, Iran. At the 2006 census, its population was 190, in 37 families.
