= Pas Bagh-e Shamshir =

Pas Bagh-e Shamshir پس باغ شمشير
- Village
- Location within Iran
- Coordinates: 31°05′14″N 50°10′15″E
- Country: Iran
- Province: Kohgiluyeh and Boyer-Ahmad
- County: Bahmai
- Bakhsh: Bahmai-ye Garmsiri
- Rural District: Sar Asiab-e Yusefi

Population (2006)
  - Total: 162
- Time zone: UTC+3:30 (IRST)
  - Summer (DST): UTC+4:30 (IRDT)

Pas Bagh-e Shamshir (Persian: پس باغ شمشير, also Romanized as Pas Bāgh-e Shamshīr; also known as Pas Bāgh) is a village in Sar Asiab-e Yusefi Rural District, Bahmai-ye Garmsiri District, Bahmai County, Kohgiluyeh and Boyer-Ahmad Province, Iran. At the 2006 census, its population was 162, in 33 families.
