= Shahrak-e Posht Gach =

Shahrak-e Posht Gach شهرك پشت گچ
- Village
- Location within Iran
- Coordinates: 30°58′23″N 50°04′44″E
- Country: Iran
- Province: Kohgiluyeh and Boyer-Ahmad
- County: Bahmai
- Bakhsh: Central
- Rural District: Bahmai-ye Garmsiri-ye Jonubi

Population (2006)
  - Total: 186
- Time zone: UTC+3:30 (IRST)
  - Summer (DST): UTC+4:30 (IRDT)

Shahrak-e Posht Gach (Persian: شهرك پشت گچ; also known as Posht Gach) is a village in Bahmai-ye Garmsiri-ye Jonubi Rural District, in the Central District of Bahmai County, Kohgiluyeh and Boyer-Ahmad Province, Iran. At the 2006 census, its population was 186, in 36 families.
