= Narbi Payeh Chaharqash =

Village in Kohgiluyeh and Boyer-Ahmad, Iran

Narbi Payeh Chaharqash نربي پيه چهارقاش
- Village
- Location within Iran
- Coordinates: 31°07′36″N 50°05′43″E
- Country: Iran
- Province: Kohgiluyeh and Boyer-Ahmad
- County: Bahmai
- Bakhsh: Bahmai-ye Garmsiri
- Rural District: Bahmai-ye Garmsiri-ye Shomali

Population (2006)
  - Total: 133
- Time zone: UTC+3:30 (IRST)
  - Summer (DST): UTC+4:30 (IRDT)

Narbi Payeh Chaharqash (Persian: نربي پيه چهارقاش, also Romanized as Narbī Payeh Chahārqāsh; also known as Narbī Payeh) is a village in Bahmai-ye Garmsiri-ye Shomali Rural District, Bahmai-ye Garmsiri District, Bahmai County, Kohgiluyeh and Boyer-Ahmad Province, Iran. At the 2006 census, its population was 133, in 25 families.
