= Do Par =

Do Par or Dowpar (Persian: دوپر) may refer to:

- Do Par Barzian
- Dowpar Nazari
- Dowpar-e Qabr-e Kiamars
