= Durab =

Durab (Persian: دوراب) may refer to:

- Durab, Kurdistan
- Durab-e Olya-ye Jadid
- Durab-e Qadim
- Durab-e Sofla-ye Jadid
