= Siah Shir =

Siah Shir سياه شير
- Village
- Location within Iran
- Coordinates: 30°52′07″N 50°04′19″E
- Country: Iran
- Province: Kohgiluyeh and Boyer-Ahmad
- County: Bahmai
- Bakhsh: Central
- Rural District: Bahmai-ye Garmsiri-ye Jonubi

Population (2006)
  - Total: 745
- Time zone: UTC+3:30 (IRST)
  - Summer (DST): UTC+4:30 (IRDT)

Siah Shir (Persian: سياه شير, also Romanized as Sīāh Shīr and Seyāh Shīr; also known as Sīāh Shīr-e ‘Olyā and Sīyāh Seīr) is a village in Bahmai-ye Garmsiri-ye Jonubi Rural District, in the Central District of Bahmai County, Kohgiluyeh and Boyer-Ahmad Province, Iran. At the 2006 census, its population was 745, in 118 families.
