= Sarangab-e Boneh Pir =

Village in Kohgiluyeh and Boyer-Ahmad, Iran

Sarangab-e Boneh Pir سرنگاب بنه پير
- Village
- Location within Iran
- Coordinates: 31°09′41″N 50°01′58″E
- Country: Iran
- Province: Kohgiluyeh and Boyer-Ahmad
- County: Bahmai
- Bakhsh: Bahmai-ye Garmsiri
- Rural District: Bahmai-ye Garmsiri-ye Shomali

Population (2006)
  - Total: 101
- Time zone: UTC+3:30 (IRST)
  - Summer (DST): UTC+4:30 (IRDT)

Sarangab-e Boneh Pir (Persian: سرنگاب بنه پير, also Romanized as Sarangāb-e Boneh Pīr; also known as Sarangāv) is a village in Bahmai-ye Garmsiri-ye Shomali Rural District, Bahmai-ye Garmsiri District, Bahmai County, Kohgiluyeh and Boyer-Ahmad Province, Iran. At the 2006 census, its population was 101, in 20 families.
