= Shilav Dun =

Shilav Dun شيلاودون
- Village
- Location within Iran
- Coordinates: 30°59′51″N 50°15′39″E
- Country: Iran
- Province: Kohgiluyeh and Boyer-Ahmad
- County: Bahmai
- Bakhsh: Bahmai-ye Garmsiri
- Rural District: Sar Asiab-e Yusefi

Population (2006)
  - Total: 106
- Time zone: UTC+3:30 (IRST)
  - Summer (DST): UTC+4:30 (IRDT)

Shilav Dun (Persian: شيلاودون, also Romanized as Shīlāv Dūn; also known as Shīlāb Dān, Shīlāb Dūn, and Shīlāvdān) is a village in Sar Asiab-e Yusefi Rural District, Bahmai-ye Garmsiri District, Bahmai County, Kohgiluyeh and Boyer-Ahmad Province, Iran. At the 2006 census, its population was 106, in 27 families.
