= Darreh Kharzaleh Deh Chel =

Darreh Kharzaleh Deh Chel دره خرزهله ده چل
- Village
- Location within Iran
- Coordinates: 31°00′26″N 50°11′40″E
- Country: Iran
- Province: Kohgiluyeh and Boyer-Ahmad
- County: Bahmai
- Bakhsh: Bahmai-ye Garmsiri
- Rural District: Sar Asiab-e Yusefi

Population (2006)
  - Total: 61
- Time zone: UTC+3:30 (IRST)
  - Summer (DST): UTC+4:30 (IRDT)

Darreh Kharzaleh Deh Chel (Persian: دره خرزهله ده چل; also known as Darreh Kharzaleh) is a village in Sar Asiab-e Yusefi Rural District, Bahmai-ye Garmsiri District, Bahmai County, Kohgiluyeh and Boyer-Ahmad Province, Iran. At the 2006 census, its population was 61, in 13 families.
