= Darreh Gepi =

Village in Kohgiluyeh and Boyer-Ahmad, Iran

Darreh Gepi دره گپي
- Village
- Location within Iran
- Coordinates: 31°10′33″N 50°00′14″E
- Country: Iran
- Province: Kohgiluyeh and Boyer-Ahmad
- County: Bahmai
- Bakhsh: Bahmai-ye Garmsiri
- Rural District: Bahmai-ye Garmsiri-ye Shomali

Population (2006)
  - Total: 185
- Time zone: UTC+3:30 (IRST)
  - Summer (DST): UTC+4:30 (IRDT)

Darreh Gepi (Persian: دره گپي, also Romanized as Darreh Gepī) is a village in Bahmai-ye Garmsiri-ye Shomali Rural District, Bahmai-ye Garmsiri District, Bahmai County, Kohgiluyeh and Boyer-Ahmad Province, Iran. At the 2006 census, its population was 185, in 25 families.
