= Gerd-e Kuchak =

Village in Kohgiluyeh and Boyer-Ahmad province, Iran

Gerd-e Kuchak Persian: گردكوچك
- Village
- Location within Iran
- Coordinates: 31°06′47″N 50°05′35″E
- Country: Iran
- Province: Kohgiluyeh and Boyer-Ahmad
- County: Bahmai
- District: Mombi
- Rural District: Bahmai-ye Garmsiri-ye Shomali

Population (2016)
  - Total: 593
- Time zone: UTC+3:30 (IRST)

Gerd-e Kuchak (Persian: گردكوچك) (Note: Also romanized as Gerd Kūchek, Gerd-e Kūchak, and Gord Kūchak) is a village in, and the capital of, Bahmai-ye Garmsiri-ye Shomali Rural District of Mombi District, Bahmai County, Kohgiluyeh and Boyer-Ahmad province, Iran. The previous capital of the rural district was the village of Qaleh Mombi, now a city.

== Demographics ==
=== Population ===
At the time of the 2006 National Census, the village's population was 472 in 83 households, when it was in Bahmai-ye Garmsiri District. (Note: Renamed Sar Asiab-e Yusefi District) The following census in 2011 counted 568 people in 130 households. The 2016 census measured the population of the village as 593 people in 159 households. It was the most populous village in its rural district.

After the census, the rural district was separated from the district in the establishment of Mombi District.
