= Ab Alvan =

Village in Kohgiluyeh and Boyer-Ahmad province, Iran

Ab Alvan Persian: اب الوان
- Village
- Location within Iran
- Coordinates: 31°00′13″N 50°12′51″E
- Country: Iran
- Province: Kohgiluyeh and Boyer-Ahmad
- County: Bahmai
- District: Sar Asiab-e Yusefi
- Rural District: Ab Alvan

Population (2016)
  - Total: 253
- Time zone: UTC+3:30 (IRST)

Ab Alvan (Persian: اب الوان) (Note: Also romanized as Āb Alvān) is a village in, and the capital of, Ab Alvan Rural District of Sar Asiab-e Yusefi District, (Note: Formerly Bahmai-ye Garmsiri District) Bahmai County, Kohgiluyeh and Boyer-Ahmad province, Iran.

== Demographics ==
=== Population ===
At the time of the 2006 National Census, the village's population was 647 in 127 households, when it was in Sar Asiab-e Yusefi Rural District. The following census in 2011 counted 474 people in 100 households. The 2016 census measured the population of the village as 253 people in 59 households.

After the census, Ab Alvan was transferred to Ab Alvan Rural District created in the district.
