= Tall Rezaqoli Mambi =

Tall Rezaqoli Mambi تل رضاقلي ممبي
- Village
- Location within Iran
- Coordinates: 31°06′58″N 50°06′39″E
- Country: Iran
- Province: Kohgiluyeh and Boyer-Ahmad
- County: Bahmai
- Bakhsh: Bahmai-ye Garmsiri
- Rural District: Bahmai-ye Garmsiri-ye Shomali

Population (2006)
  - Total: 160
- Time zone: UTC+3:30 (IRST)
  - Summer (DST): UTC+4:30 (IRDT)

Tall Rezaqoli Mambi (Persian: تل رضاقلي ممبي, also Romanized as Tall Reẕāqolī Mambī; also known as Tall Reẕāqolī) is a village in Bahmai-ye Garmsiri-ye Shomali Rural District, Bahmai-ye Garmsiri District, Bahmai County, Kohgiluyeh and Boyer-Ahmad Province, Iran. At the 2006 census, its population was 160, in 27 families.
