= Shahrak-e Gowd Band =

Shahrak-e Gowd Band شهرك گودبند
- Village
- Location within Iran
- Coordinates: 30°57′46″N 50°05′59″E
- Country: Iran
- Province: Kohgiluyeh and Boyer-Ahmad
- County: Bahmai
- Bakhsh: Central
- Rural District: Bahmai-ye Garmsiri-ye Jonubi

Population (2006)
  - Total: 128
- Time zone: UTC+3:30 (IRST)
  - Summer (DST): UTC+4:30 (IRDT)

Shahrak-e Gowd Band (Persian: شهرك گودبند; also known as Gowd-e Band and Shahrak-e Gowd Band-e Posht Gach) is a village in Bahmai-ye Garmsiri-ye Jonubi Rural District, in the Central District of Bahmai County, Kohgiluyeh and Boyer-Ahmad Province, Iran. At the 2006 census, its population was 128, in 24 families.
