= Parah Ardeshir-e Jadid =

Village in Kohgiluyeh and Boyer-Ahmad, Iran

Parah Ardeshir-e Jadid پاراه اردشيرجديد
- Village
- Location within Iran
- Coordinates: 31°07′07″N 50°08′22″E
- Country: Iran
- Province: Kohgiluyeh and Boyer-Ahmad
- County: Bahmai
- Bakhsh: Bahmai-ye Garmsiri
- Rural District: Bahmai-ye Garmsiri-ye Shomali

Population (2006)
  - Total: 123
- Time zone: UTC+3:30 (IRST)
  - Summer (DST): UTC+4:30 (IRDT)

Parah Ardeshir-e Jadid (Persian: پاراه اردشيرجديد, also Romanized as Pārah Ardeshīr-e Jadīd; also known as Pārah Ardeshīr) is a village in Bahmai-ye Garmsiri-ye Shomali Rural District, Bahmai-ye Garmsiri District, Bahmai County, Kohgiluyeh and Boyer-Ahmad Province, Iran. At the 2006 census, its population was 123, in 29 families.
