= Narmun, Kohgiluyeh and Boyer-Ahmad =

Village in Kohgiluyeh and Boyer-Ahmad province, Iran

Narmun Persian: نرمون
- Village
- Location within Iran
- Coordinates: 31°09′10″N 50°02′38″E
- Country: Iran
- Province: Kohgiluyeh and Boyer-Ahmad
- County: Bahmai
- District: Mombi
- Rural District: Rudtalkh

Population (2016)
  - Total: 414
- Time zone: UTC+3:30 (IRST)

Narmun (Persian: نرمون) (Note: Also romanized as Narmūn) is a village in, and the capital of, Rudtalkh Rural District of Mombi District, Bahmai County, Kohgiluyeh and Boyer-Ahmad province, Iran.

== Demographics ==
=== Population ===
At the time of the 2006 National Census, the village's population was 289 in 60 households, when it was in Bahmai-ye Garmsiri-ye Shomali Rural District of Bahmai-ye Garmsiri District. (Note: Renamed Sar Asiab-e Yusefi District) The following census in 2011 counted 261 people in 66 households. The 2016 census measured the population of the village as 414 people in 111 households.

After the census, the rural district was separated from the district in the formation of Mombi District, and Narmun was transferred to Rudtalkh Rural District created in the new district.
