= Mafeh-ye Rudtalkh =

Mafeh-ye Rudtalkh مافه رودتلخ
- Village
- Location within Iran
- Coordinates: 31°10′40″N 50°01′36″E
- Country: Iran
- Province: Kohgiluyeh and Boyer-Ahmad
- County: Bahmai
- Bakhsh: Bahmai-ye Garmsiri
- Rural District: Bahmai-ye Garmsiri-ye Shomali

Population (2006)
  - Total: 95
- Time zone: UTC+3:30 (IRST)
  - Summer (DST): UTC+4:30 (IRDT)

Mafeh-ye Rudtalkh (Persian: مافه رودتلخ, also Romanized as Māfeh-e Rūdtalkh; also known as Māfeh) is a village in Bahmai-ye Garmsiri-ye Shomali Rural District, Bahmai-ye Garmsiri District, Bahmai County, Kohgiluyeh and Boyer-Ahmad Province, Iran. At the 2006 census, its population was 95, in 21 families.
