= Dorahi-ye Gachboland =

Dorahi-ye Gachboland دوراهي گچ بلند
- Village
- Location within Iran
- Coordinates: 30°57′05″N 50°05′48″E
- Country: Iran
- Province: Kohgiluyeh and Boyer-Ahmad
- County: Bahmai
- Bakhsh: Central
- Rural District: Bahmai-ye Garmsiri-ye Jonubi

Population (2006)
  - Total: 72
- Time zone: UTC+3:30 (IRST)
  - Summer (DST): UTC+4:30 (IRDT)

Dorahi-ye Gachboland (Persian: دوراهي گچ بلند, also Romanized as Dorāhī-ye Gachboland) is a village in Bahmai-ye Garmsiri-ye Jonubi Rural District, in the Central District of Bahmai County, Kohgiluyeh and Boyer-Ahmad Province, Iran. At the 2006 census, its population was 72, in 15 families.
