= Shahrak-e Sadat Gach Boland =

Shahrak-e Sadat Gach Baland شهرك سادات گچ بلند
- Village
- Country: Iran
- Province: Kohgiluyeh and Boyer-Ahmad
- County: Bahmai
- Bakhsh: Central
- Rural District: Bahmai-ye Garmsiri-ye Jonubi

Population (2006)
  - Total: 612
- Time zone: UTC+3:30 (IRST)
  - Summer (DST): UTC+4:30 (IRDT)

Shahrak-e Sadat Gach Baland (Persian: شهرك سادات گچ بلند, also Romanized as Shahrak-e Sādāt Gach Boland) is a village in Bahmai-ye Garmsiri-ye Jonubi Rural District, in the Central District of Bahmai County, Kohgiluyeh and Boyer-Ahmad Province, Iran. At the 2006 census, its population was 612, in 114 families.
