= Kelavan-e Rudtalkh =

Kelavan-e Rudtalkh كلاون رودتلخ
- Village
- Location within Iran
- Coordinates: 31°09′58″N 50°01′49″E
- Country: Iran
- Province: Kohgiluyeh and Boyer-Ahmad
- County: Bahmai
- Bakhsh: Bahmai-ye Garmsiri
- Rural District: Bahmai-ye Garmsiri-ye Shomali

Population (2006)
  - Total: 33
- Time zone: UTC+3:30 (IRST)
  - Summer (DST): UTC+4:30 (IRDT)

Kelavan-e Rudtalkh (Persian: كلاون رودتلخ, also Romanized as Kelāvan-e Rūdtalkh; also known as Kelāvan) is a village in Bahmai-ye Garmsiri-ye Shomali Rural District, Bahmai-ye Garmsiri District, Bahmai County, Kohgiluyeh and Boyer-Ahmad Province, Iran. At the 2006 census, its population was 33, in 5 families.
