= Dasht-e Ahu, Kohgiluyeh and Boyer-Ahmad =

Dasht-e Ahu دشت اهو
- Village
- Location within Iran
- Coordinates: 30°57′38″N 49°57′35″E
- Country: Iran
- Province: Kohgiluyeh and Boyer-Ahmad
- County: Bahmai
- Bakhsh: Central
- Rural District: Bahmai-ye Garmsiri-ye Jonubi

Population (2006)
  - Total: 172
- Time zone: UTC+3:30 (IRST)
  - Summer (DST): UTC+4:30 (IRDT)

Dasht-e Ahu (Persian: دشت اهو, also Romanized as Dasht-e Ahū; also known as Dasht-e Ahū-e Yek) is a village in Bahmai-ye Garmsiri-ye Jonubi Rural District, in the Central District of Bahmai County, Kohgiluyeh and Boyer-Ahmad Province, Iran. At the 2006 census, its population was 172, in 37 families.
