= Ab Lashkar =

Ab Lashkar (Persian: اب لشكر) may refer to:

- Ab Lashkar-e Olya, a village in the Rud Zard Rural District, Iran
- Ab Lashkar-e Sofla, a village in the Rud Zard Rural District, Iran
- Ab Lashkar-e Vosta, a village in the Rud Zard Rural District, Iran
