= Delli =

Delli (Persian: دلي) may refer to:

- Delli-ye Cheman
- Delli-ye Mohsaleh Aqa
- Delli-ye Solmavand
- Karima Delli (born 1979), French politician

== See also ==
- Delhi
- Dili
