= Qashkamari-ye Boneh Pir =

Village in Iran

Qashkamari-ye Boneh Pir قاش كمري بنه پير
- Village
- Location within Iran
- Coordinates: 31°10′25″N 50°03′09″E
- Country: Iran
- Province: Kohgiluyeh and Boyer-Ahmad
- County: Bahmai
- Bakhsh: Bahmai-ye Garmsiri
- Rural District: Bahmai-ye Garmsiri-ye Shomali

Population (2006)
  - Total: 129
- Time zone: UTC+3:30 (IRST)
  - Summer (DST): UTC+4:30 (IRDT)

Qashkamari-ye Boneh Pir (Persian: قاش كمري بنه پير, also Romanized as Qāshkamarī-ye Boneh Pīr; also known as Qāshkamarī) is a village in Bahmai-ye Garmsiri-ye Shomali Rural District, Bahmai-ye Garmsiri District, Bahmai County, Kohgiluyeh and Boyer-Ahmad Province, Iran. At the 2006 census, its population was 129, in 27 families.
