= Chahar Rah-e Chari =

Chahar Rah-e Chari چهارراه چرئ
- Village
- Location within Iran
- Coordinates: 31°07′38″N 50°06′31″E
- Country: Iran
- Province: Kohgiluyeh and Boyer-Ahmad
- County: Bahmai
- Bakhsh: Bahmai-ye Garmsiri
- Rural District: Bahmai-ye Garmsiri-ye Shomali

Population (2006)
  - Total: 196
- Time zone: UTC+3:30 (IRST)
  - Summer (DST): UTC+4:30 (IRDT)

Chahar Rah-e Chari (Persian: چهارراه چرئ, also Romanized as Chahār Rāh-e Charī) is a village in Bahmai-ye Garmsiri-ye Shomali Rural District, Bahmai-ye Garmsiri District, Bahmai County, Kohgiluyeh and Boyer-Ahmad Province, Iran. At the 2006 census, its population was 196, in 30 families.
