= Tanguleh-ye Anjir =

Village in Kohgiluyeh and Boyer-Ahmad, Iran

Tanguleh-ye Anjir تنگ گوله انجير
- Village
- Location within Iran
- Coordinates: 31°08′09″N 50°07′41″E
- Country: Iran
- Province: Kohgiluyeh and Boyer-Ahmad
- County: Bahmai
- Bakhsh: Bahmai-ye Garmsiri
- Rural District: Bahmai-ye Garmsiri-ye Shomali

Population (2006)
  - Total: 184
- Time zone: UTC+3:30 (IRST)
  - Summer (DST): UTC+4:30 (IRDT)

Tanguleh-ye Anjir (Persian: تنگ گوله انجير, also Romanized as Tangūleh-ye Anjīr) is a village in Bahmai-ye Garmsiri-ye Shomali Rural District, Bahmai-ye Garmsiri District, Bahmai County, Kohgiluyeh and Boyer-Ahmad Province, Iran. At the 2006 census, its population was 184, in 36 families.
