= Deh-e Bonar-e Yusefi =

Village in Kohgiluyeh and Boyer-Ahmad province, Iran

Deh-e Bonar-e Yusefi Persian: ده بنار يوسفي
- Village
- Location within Iran
- Coordinates: 31°02′15″N 50°13′35″E
- Country: Iran
- Province: Kohgiluyeh and Boyer-Ahmad
- County: Bahmai
- District: Sar Asiab-e Yusefi
- Rural District: Sar Asiab-e Yusefi

Population (2016)
  - Total: 242
- Time zone: UTC+3:30 (IRST)

Deh-e Bonar-e Yusefi (Persian: ده بناريوسفي) (Note: Also romanized as Deh-e Bonār-e Yūsefī; also known as Deh-e Bonār) is a village in, and the capital of, Sar Asiab-e Yusefi Rural District of Sar Asiab-e Yusefi District, (Note: Formerly Bahmai-ye Garmsiri District) Bahmai County, Kohgiluyeh and Boyer-Ahmad province, Iran. The previous capital of the rural district was the village of Sar Asiab-e Yusefi, now a city.

== Demographics ==
=== Population ===
At the time of the 2006 National Census, the village's population was 282 in 53 households. The following census in 2011 counted 379 people in 95 households. The 2016 census measured the population of the village as 242 people in 60 households.
