= Gonbadbardi-ye Sofla =

Gonbadbardi-ye Sofla گنبدبردي سفلي
- Village
- Location within Iran
- Coordinates: 31°05′41″N 49°59′37″E
- Country: Iran
- Province: Kohgiluyeh and Boyer-Ahmad
- County: Bahmai
- Bakhsh: Central
- Rural District: Bahmai-ye Garmsiri-ye Jonubi

Population (2006)
  - Total: 167
- Time zone: UTC+3:30 (IRST)
  - Summer (DST): UTC+4:30 (IRDT)

Gonbadbardi-ye Sofla (Persian: گنبدبردي سفلي, also Romanized as Gonbadbardī-ye Soflá) is a village in Bahmai-ye Garmsiri-ye Jonubi Rural District, in the Central District of Bahmai County, Kohgiluyeh and Boyer-Ahmad Province, Iran. At the 2006 census, its population was 167, in 33 families.
