= Narmun =

Narmun (Persian: نرمون) may refer to:

- Narmun, Fars
- Narmun, Kohgiluyeh and Boyer-Ahmad
