= Talkheh Dan-e Olya =

Talkheh Dan-e Olya تلخه دان عليا
- Village
- Location within Iran
- Coordinates: 30°59′46″N 50°15′12″E
- Country: Iran
- Province: Kohgiluyeh and Boyer-Ahmad
- County: Bahmai
- Bakhsh: Bahmai-ye Garmsiri
- Rural District: Sar Asiab-e Yusefi

Population (2006)
  - Total: 65
- Time zone: UTC+3:30 (IRST)
  - Summer (DST): UTC+4:30 (IRDT)

Talkheh Dan-e Olya (Persian: تلخه دان عليا, also Romanized as Talkheh Dān-e ‘Olyā; also known as Talkhehdān) is a village in Sar Asiab-e Yusefi Rural District, Bahmai-ye Garmsiri District, Bahmai County, Kohgiluyeh and Boyer-Ahmad Province, Iran. At the 2006 census, its population was 65, in 12 families.
