= Badamlu =

Badamlu (Persian: باداملو) may refer to:

- Badamlu, East Azerbaijan
- Badamlu, Kerman
- Badamlu, West Azerbaijan
