= Poshtaveh =

Poshtaveh (Persian: پشت طاوه) may refer to:

- Poshtaveh-ye Olya
- Poshtaveh-ye Sofla
