= Rudtalkh Rural District =

Rural district in Kohgiluyeh and Boyer-Ahmad province, Iran

Rudtalkh Rural District Persian: دهستان رودتلخ
- Rural District
- Location within Iran
- Coordinates: 31°10′46″N 50°03′59″E
- Country: Iran
- Province: Kohgiluyeh and Boyer-Ahmad
- County: Bahmai
- District: Mombi
- Capital: Narmun
- Time zone: UTC+3:30 (IRST)

Rudtalkh Rural District (Persian: دهستان رودتلخ) is in Mombi District of Bahmai County, Kohgiluyeh and Boyer-Ahmad province, Iran. Its capital is the village of Narmun, whose population at the time of the 2016 National Census was 414 in 111 households.

== History ==
After the 2016 census, Bahmai-ye Garmsiri-ye Shomali Rural District was separated from Bahmai-ye Garmsiri District in the formation of Mombi District, and Rudtalkh Rural District was created in the new district.
