= Durab-e Qadim =

Durab-e Qadim دوراب قديم
- Village
- Location within Iran
- Coordinates: 31°11′59″N 50°33′41″E
- Country: Iran
- Province: Kohgiluyeh and Boyer-Ahmad
- County: Bahmai
- Bakhsh: Bahmai-ye Garmsiri
- Rural District: Bahmai-ye Garmsiri-ye Shomali

Population (2006)
  - Total: 30
- Time zone: UTC+3:30 (IRST)
  - Summer (DST): UTC+4:30 (IRDT)

Durab-e Qadim (Persian: دوراب قديم, also Romanized as Dūrāb-e Qadīm; also known as Dūrāb) is a village in Bahmai-ye Garmsiri-ye Shomali Rural District, Bahmai-ye Garmsiri District, Bahmai County, Kohgiluyeh and Boyer-Ahmad Province, Iran. At the 2006 census, its population was 30, in 7 families.
