= Kat, Kohgiluyeh and Boyer-Ahmad =

Village in Kohgiluyeh and Boyer-Ahmad province, Iran

Kat Persian: كت
- Village
- Location within Iran
- Coordinates: 31°00′58″N 50°01′17″E
- Country: Iran
- Province: Kohgiluyeh and Boyer-Ahmad
- County: Bahmai
- District: Central
- Rural District: Bahmai-ye Garmsiri-ye Jonubi

Population (2016)
  - Total: 275
- Time zone: UTC+3:30 (IRST)

Kat (Persian: كت) (Note: Also known as Chat) is a village in, and the capital of, Bahmai-ye Garmsiri-ye Jonubi Rural District of the Central District of Bahmai County, Kohgiluyeh and Boyer-Ahmad province, Iran. The rural district was previously administered from the city of Likak.

== Demographics ==
=== Population ===
At the time of the 2006 National Census, the village's population was 388 in 76 households. The following census in 2011 counted 359 people in 85 households. The 2016 census measured the population of the village as 275 people in 73 households.
