= Gach Boland =

Village in Kohgiluyeh and Boyer-Ahmad province, Iran

Gach Boland Persian: گچ بلند
- Village
- Location within Iran
- Coordinates: 30°57′00″N 50°06′41″E
- Country: Iran
- Province: Kohgiluyeh and Boyer-Ahmad
- County: Bahmai
- District: Central
- Rural District: Bahmai-ye Garmsiri-ye Jonubi

Population (2016)
  - Total: 766
- Time zone: UTC+3:30 (IRST)

Gach Boland (Persian: گچ بلند) is a village in Bahmai-ye Garmsiri-ye Jonubi Rural District of the Central District of Bahmai County, Kohgiluyeh and Boyer-Ahmad province, Iran.

== Demographics ==
=== Population ===
At the time of the 2006 National Census, the village's population was 764 in 146 households. The following census in 2011 counted 861 people in 192 households. The 2016 census measured the population of the village as 766 people in 203 households. It was the most populous village in its rural district.
