= Durab-e Sofla-ye Jadid =

Durab-e Sofla-ye Jadid دوراب سفلي جديد
- Village
- Location within Iran
- Coordinates: 31°05′41″N 50°08′55″E
- Country: Iran
- Province: Kohgiluyeh and Boyer-Ahmad
- County: Bahmai
- Bakhsh: Bahmai-ye Garmsiri
- Rural District: Bahmai-ye Garmsiri-ye Shomali

Population (2006)
  - Total: 101
- Time zone: UTC+3:30 (IRST)
  - Summer (DST): UTC+4:30 (IRDT)

Durab-e Sofla-ye Jadid (Persian: دوراب سفلي جديد, also Romanized as Dūrāb-e Soflá-ye Jadīd; also known as Dūrāb-e Soflá) is a village in Bahmai-ye Garmsiri-ye Shomali Rural District, Bahmai-ye Garmsiri District, Bahmai County, Kohgiluyeh and Boyer-Ahmad Province, Iran. At the 2006 census, its population was 101, in 20 families.
