= Kelasmadin =

Kelasmadin (Persian: كلاسمدين) may refer to:

- Kelasmadin 1
- Kelasmadin 2
