= Dowpar Nazari =

Dowpar Nazari دوپرنظري
- Village
- Location within Iran
- Coordinates: 30°59′50″N 50°03′12″E
- Country: Iran
- Province: Kohgiluyeh and Boyer-Ahmad
- County: Bahmai
- Bakhsh: Central
- Rural District: Bahmai-ye Garmsiri-ye Jonubi

Population (2006)
  - Total: 413
- Time zone: UTC+3:30 (IRST)
  - Summer (DST): UTC+4:30 (IRDT)

Dowpar Nazari (Persian: دوپرنظري, also Romanized as Dowpar Naz̧arī; also known as Depar, Depar Naz̧arī, and Doparnaz̧arī) is a village in Bahmai-ye Garmsiri-ye Jonubi Rural District, in the Central District of Bahmai County, Kohgiluyeh and Boyer-Ahmad Province, Iran. At the 2006 census, its population was 413, in 80 families.
