= Kafsh Kanan =

Village in Kohgiluyeh and Boyer-Ahmad province, Iran

Kafsh Kanan Persian: كفش كنان
- Village
- Location within Iran
- Coordinates: 30°48′01″N 50°17′43″E
- Country: Iran
- Province: Kohgiluyeh and Boyer-Ahmad
- County: Bahmai
- District: Central
- Rural District: Kafsh Kanan

Population (2016)
  - Total: 295
- Time zone: UTC+3:30 (IRST)

Kafsh Kanan (Persian: كفش كنان) (Note: Also romanized as Kafsh Kanān and Kafshkanān; also known as Khowsh Āb-e Talkh, Khowshāb, Khvosh Āb-e Talkh, Khvoshāb, and Khvoshāb Talkh) is a village in, and the capital of, Kafsh Kanan Rural District of the Central District of Bahmai County, Kohgiluyeh and Boyer-Ahmad province, Iran.

== Demographics ==
=== Population ===
At the time of the 2006 National Census, the village's population was 340 in 67 households. The following census in 2011 counted 330 people in 69 households. The 2016 census measured the population of the village as 295 people in 83 households.
