= Do Par Barzian =

Do Par Barzian دوپربرزيان
- Village
- Country: Iran
- Province: Kohgiluyeh and Boyer-Ahmad
- County: Bahmai
- Bakhsh: Central
- Rural District: Kafsh Kanan

Population (2006)
  - Total: 36
- Time zone: UTC+3:30 (IRST)
  - Summer (DST): UTC+4:30 (IRDT)

Do Par Barzian (Persian: دوپربرزيان, also Romanized as Do Par Barzīān) is a village in Kafsh Kanan Rural District, in the Central District of Bahmai County, Kohgiluyeh and Boyer-Ahmad Province, Iran. At the 2006 census, its population was 36, in 5 families.
