= Tarakab =

Tarakab or Tarkab (Persian: تركاب) may refer to:

- Tarakab, Bagh-e Malek
- Tarakab, Izeh
