= Darreh Khar Zahreh =

Darreh Khar Zahreh or Darreh Kharzahreh (Persian: دره خرزهره) may refer to:

- Darreh Khar Zahreh, Khuzestan
- Darreh Kharzahreh, Kohgiluyeh and Boyer-Ahmad
