= Darreh Kharzahreh, Kohgiluyeh and Boyer-Ahmad =

Darreh Kharzahreh دره خرزهره
- Village
- Location within Iran
- Coordinates: 31°08′08″N 50°06′19″E
- Country: Iran
- Province: Kohgiluyeh and Boyer-Ahmad
- County: Bahmai
- Bakhsh: Bahmai-ye Garmsiri
- Rural District: Bahmai-ye Garmsiri-ye Shomali

Population (2006)
  - Total: 221
- Time zone: UTC+3:30 (IRST)
  - Summer (DST): UTC+4:30 (IRDT)

Darreh Kharzahreh (Persian: دره خرزهره) is a village in Bahmai-ye Garmsiri-ye Shomali Rural District, Bahmai-ye Garmsiri District, Bahmai County, Kohgiluyeh and Boyer-Ahmad Province, Iran. At the 2006 census, its population was 221, in 40 families.
