= Shah Vali, Bahmai-ye Garmsiri =

Shah Vali شاه ولي
- Village
- Location within Iran
- Coordinates: 31°04′01″N 50°11′08″E
- Country: Iran
- Province: Kohgiluyeh and Boyer-Ahmad
- County: Bahmai
- Bakhsh: Bahmai-ye Garmsiri
- Rural District: Sar Asiab-e Yusefi

Population (2006)
  - Total: 84
- Time zone: UTC+3:30 (IRST)
  - Summer (DST): UTC+4:30 (IRDT)

Shah Vali (Persian: شاه ولي, also Romanized as Shāh Valī) is a village in Sar Asiab-e Yusefi Rural District, Bahmai-ye Garmsiri District, Bahmai County, Kohgiluyeh and Boyer-Ahmad Province, Iran. At the 2006 census, its population was 84, in 18 families.
