= Poshtaveh-ye Sofla =

Poshtaveh-ye Sofla پشت طاوه سفلي
- Village
- Location within Iran
- Coordinates: 30°56′03″N 50°09′55″E
- Country: Iran
- Province: Kohgiluyeh and Boyer-Ahmad
- County: Bahmai
- Bakhsh: Central
- Rural District: Bahmai-ye Garmsiri-ye Jonubi

Population (2006)
  - Total: 21
- Time zone: UTC+3:30 (IRST)
  - Summer (DST): UTC+4:30 (IRDT)

Poshtaveh-ye Sofla (Persian: پشت طاوه سفلي, also Romanized as Poshtāveh-ye Soflá; also known as Poshtāveh-ye Pā’īn) is a village in Bahmai-ye Garmsiri-ye Jonubi Rural District, in the Central District of Bahmai County, Kohgiluyeh and Boyer-Ahmad Province, Iran. At the 2006 census, its population was 21, in 5 families.
