= Shahrak-e Vali-ye Asr, Kohgiluyeh and Boyer-Ahmad =

Village in Kohgiluyeh and Boyer-Ahmad province, Iran

Shahrak-e Vali-ye Asr Persian: شهرك ولي عصر
- Village
- Location within Iran
- Coordinates: 30°48′18″N 50°14′35″E
- Country: Iran
- Province: Kohgiluyeh and Boyer-Ahmad
- County: Bahmai
- District: Central
- Rural District: Kafsh Kanan

Population (2016)
  - Total: 796
- Time zone: UTC+3:30 (IRST)

Shahrak-e Vali-ye Asr (Persian: شهرك ولي عصر)) (Note: Also romanized as Shahrak-e Valī-ye ʿAṣr) is a village in Kafsh Kanan Rural District of the Central District of Bahmai County, Kohgiluyeh and Boyer-Ahmad province, Iran.

== Demographics ==
=== Population ===
At the time of the 2006 National Census, the village's population was 1,050 in 213 households. The following census in 2011 counted 1,176 people in 311 households. The 2016 census measured the population of the village as 796 people in 236 households. It was the most populous village in its rural district.
