= Talageh =

Talageh or Talagah (Persian: طلاگه) may refer to:

- Talagah-e Olya, Kohgiluyeh and Boyer-Ahmad
- Talagah-e Sofla, Kohgiluyeh and Boyer-Ahmad
- Talageh-ye Sofla, Khuzestan
