= Durab-e Olya-ye Jadid =

Durab-e Olya-ye Jadid دوراب علياجديد
- Village
- Location within Iran
- Coordinates: 31°06′01″N 50°08′55″E
- Country: Iran
- Province: Kohgiluyeh and Boyer-Ahmad
- County: Bahmai
- Bakhsh: Bahmai-ye Garmsiri
- Rural District: Bahmai-ye Garmsiri-ye Shomali

Population (2006)
  - Total: 81
- Time zone: UTC+3:30 (IRST)
  - Summer (DST): UTC+4:30 (IRDT)

Durab-e Olya-ye Jadid (Persian: دوراب علياجديد, also Romanized as Dūrāb-e ‘Olyā-ye Jadīd; also known as Dūrāb-e ‘Olyā) is a village in Bahmai-ye Garmsiri-ye Shomali Rural District, Bahmai-ye Garmsiri District, Bahmai County, Kohgiluyeh and Boyer-Ahmad Province, Iran. At the 2006 census, its population was 81, in 20 families.
