= Badaman =

Badaman (Persian: بادامان) may refer to:

- Badaman, Kerman
- Badaman, Kohgiluyeh and Boyer-Ahmad
