= Seyyed Saleh, Kohgiluyeh and Boyer-Ahmad =

Seyyed Saleh سيدصالح
- Village
- Location within Iran
- Coordinates: 31°12′09″N 49°59′52″E
- Country: Iran
- Province: Kohgiluyeh and Boyer-Ahmad
- County: Bahmai
- Bakhsh: Bahmai-ye Garmsiri
- Rural District: Bahmai-ye Garmsiri-ye Shomali

Population (2006)
  - Total: 94
- Time zone: UTC+3:30 (IRST)
  - Summer (DST): UTC+4:30 (IRDT)

Seyyed Saleh (Persian: سيدصالح, also Romanized as Seyyed Şāleḩ) is a village in Bahmai-ye Garmsiri-ye Shomali Rural District, Bahmai-ye Garmsiri District, Bahmai County, Kohgiluyeh and Boyer-Ahmad Province, Iran. At the 2006 census, its population was 94, in 17 families.
