= Gonbadbardi =

Gonbadbardi (Persian: گنبدبردي) may refer to:

- Gonbadbardi-ye Olya
- Gonbadbardi-ye Sofla
