= Gonbadbardi-ye Olya =

Gonbadbardi-ye Olya گنبدبردي عليا
- Village
- Location within Iran
- Coordinates: 31°04′58″N 50°00′35″E
- Country: Iran
- Province: Kohgiluyeh and Boyer-Ahmad
- County: Bahmai
- Bakhsh: Central
- Rural District: Bahmai-ye Garmsiri-ye Jonubi

Population (2006)
  - Total: 311
- Time zone: UTC+3:30 (IRST)
  - Summer (DST): UTC+4:30 (IRDT)

Gonbadbardi-ye Olya (Persian: گنبدبردي عليا, also Romanized as Gonbadbardī-ye ‘Olyā) is a village in Bahmai-ye Garmsiri-ye Jonubi Rural District, in the Central District of Bahmai County, Kohgiluyeh and Boyer-Ahmad Province, Iran. At the 2006 census, its population was 311, in 64 families.
