= Sartuf Kat =

Sartuf Kat سرطوف كت
- Village
- Location within Iran
- Coordinates: 31°01′15″N 50°00′37″E
- Country: Iran
- Province: Kohgiluyeh and Boyer-Ahmad
- County: Bahmai
- Bakhsh: Central
- Rural District: Bahmai-ye Garmsiri-ye Jonubi

Population (2006)
  - Total: 206
- Time zone: UTC+3:30 (IRST)
  - Summer (DST): UTC+4:30 (IRDT)

Sartuf Kat (Persian: سرطوف كت, also Romanized as Sarţūf Kat; also known as Sarţūf) is a village in Bahmai-ye Garmsiri-ye Jonubi Rural District, in the Central District of Bahmai County, Kohgiluyeh and Boyer-Ahmad Province, Iran. At the 2006 census, its population was 206, in 37 families.
