= Cham Sharu =

Cham Sharu چم شرو
- Village
- Location within Iran
- Coordinates: 31°00′37″N 50°00′13″E
- Country: Iran
- Province: Kohgiluyeh and Boyer-Ahmad
- County: Bahmai
- Bakhsh: Central
- Rural District: Bahmai-ye Garmsiri-ye Jonubi

Population (2006)
  - Total: 55
- Time zone: UTC+3:30 (IRST)
  - Summer (DST): UTC+4:30 (IRDT)

Cham Sharu (Persian: چم شرو, also Romanized as Cham Sharū; also known as Cham Shahrū) is a village in Bahmai-ye Garmsiri-ye Jonubi Rural District, in the Central District of Bahmai County, Kohgiluyeh and Boyer-Ahmad Province, Iran. At the 2006 census, its population was 55, in 9 families.
