= Darreh Ahvazi =

Darreh Ahvazi دره اهوازی
- Village
- Location within Iran
- Coordinates: 31°30′59″N 49°43′09″E
- Country: Iran
- Province: Khuzestan
- County: Bagh-e Malek
- Bakhsh: Central
- Rural District: Rud Zard

Population (2006)
  - Total: 39
- Time zone: UTC+3:30 (IRST)
  - Summer (DST): UTC+4:30 (IRDT)

Darreh Ahvazi (Persian: دره اهوازی, also Romanized as Darreh Ahvāzī; also known as Darreh Ahvāz) is a village in Rud Zard Rural District, in the Central District of Bagh-e Malek County, Khuzestan Province, Iran. At the 2006 census, its population was 39, in 9 families.
