= Gowd-e Azhdar =

Godazhdar گوداژدر
- Village
- Location within Iran
- Coordinates: 31°33′34″N 49°44′51″E
- Country: Iran
- Province: Khuzestan
- County: Bagh-e Malek
- Bakhsh: Central
- Rural District: Rud Zard

Population (2006)
  - Total: 25
- Time zone: UTC+3:30 (IRST)
  - Summer (DST): UTC+4:30 (IRDT)

Gowd-e Azhdar (Persian: گوداژدر; also known as Qowd-e Azhdar) is a village in Rud Zard Rural District, in the Central District of Bagh-e Malek County, Khuzestan Province, Iran. At the 2006 census, its population was 25, in 4 families.
