= Shah Waliullah (disambiguation) =

Shah Waliullah Dehlawi (1703–1762) was an Indian Islamic scholar and reformer.

Shah Waliullah may also refer to:

- Ablai Khan, Wāli-ūllah Abū'l-Mansūr Khan (1711—1781), king of Turan
- Shah Amanat, Shāh Amānat Ullāh Khān (died 1809), saint of Chittagong
- Shah Waliullah Adeeb (born 1969), former governor of Badakhshan, Afghanistan
- Shah Wali Ullah Nagar, a neighborhood in Orangi Town in Karachi, Pakistan

== See also ==
- Shahvali (disambiguation)
