= Seyyed Saleh =

Seyyed Saleh (Persian: سيدصالح) may refer to:

- Seyyed Saleh, Khuzestan
- Seyyed Saleh, Kohgiluyeh and Boyer-Ahmad
