= Sharur (disambiguation) =

Sharur or Şərur, the capital town and most populous municipality of Sharur Rayon in Nakhchivan Autonomous Republic of Azerbaijan

It may also refer to:

- Sharur District or Sharur Rayon, a rayon of Azerbaijan in the Nakhchivan Autonomous Republic
- Sharur-Daralagezsky Uyezd, an uyezd of the Erivan Governorate of the Caucasus Viceroyalty of the Russian Empire
- Sharur, Iran, a village in Bizineh Rud Rural District, Bizineh Rud District, Khodabandeh County, Zanjan Province, Iran
- Sharur (mythological weapon), mythological weapon wielded by the Akkadian god Ninurta

== See also ==
- Sharur Turkish High School
- Sharu (disambiguation)
