= Sharu (disambiguation) =

Sharu is a village in Qilab Rural District, Alvar-e Garmsiri District, Andimeshk County, Khuzestan Province, Iran.

Sharu may also refer to:

- Cham Sharu, a village in Bahmai-ye Garmsiri-ye Jonubi Rural District, in the Central District of Bahmai County, Kohgiluyeh and Boyer-Ahmad Province, Iran
- Sharu Naraji (born 1984), Iranian footballer
