= Chaga Parviz =

Chaga Parviz چگاپرويز
- Village
- Location within Iran
- Coordinates: 31°32′42″N 49°44′29″E
- Country: Iran
- Province: Khuzestan
- County: Bagh-e Malek
- Bakhsh: Central
- Rural District: Rud Zard

Population (2006)
  - Total: 29
- Time zone: UTC+3:30 (IRST)
  - Summer (DST): UTC+4:30 (IRDT)

Chaga Parviz (Persian: چگاپرويز, also Romanized as Chagā Parvīz) is a village in Rud Zard Rural District, in the Central District of Bagh-e Malek County, Khuzestan Province, Iran. At the 2006 census, its population was 29, in 4 families.
