= Chal-e Mohammad Hoseyn-e Sofla =

Chal-e Mohammad Hoseyn-e Sofla چال محمدحسين سفلي
- Village
- Location within Iran
- Coordinates: 31°29′43″N 49°51′04″E
- Country: Iran
- Province: Khuzestan
- County: Bagh-e Malek
- Bakhsh: Central
- Rural District: Rud Zard

Population (2006)
  - Total: 100
- Time zone: UTC+3:30 (IRST)
  - Summer (DST): UTC+4:30 (IRDT)

Chal-e Mohammad Hoseyn-e Sofla (Persian: چال محمدحسين سفلي, also Romanized as Chāl-e Moḩammad Ḩoseyn-e Soflá; also known as Chāh-e Moḩammad Ḩasan, Chāl-e Moḩammad Ḩasan, and Chāl-e Moḩammad Ḩoseyn) is a village in Rud Zard Rural District, in the Central District of Bagh-e Malek County, Khuzestan Province, Iran. At the 2006 census, its population was 100, in 21 families.
