= Qaleh Mombi =

City in Kohgiluyeh and Boyer-Ahmad province, Iran

Qaleh Mombi Persian: قلعه ممبي
- City
- Location within Iran
- Coordinates: 31°06′34″N 50°06′58″E
- Country: Iran
- Province: Kohgiluyeh and Boyer-Ahmad
- County: Bahmai
- District: Mombi

Population (2016)
  - Total: 668
- Time zone: UTC+3:30 (IRST)

Qaleh Mombi (Persian: قلعه ممبي) (Note: Also romanized as Qal‘eh Mombī and Qal‘eh-ye Māmbī) is a city in, and the capital of, Mombi District of Bahmai County, Kohgiluyeh and Boyer-Ahmad province, Iran. As a village, it was the capital of Bahmai-ye Garmsiri-ye Shomali Rural District until its capital was transferred to the village of Gerd-e Kuchak.

== Demographics ==
=== Population ===
At the time of the 2006 National Census, Qaleh Mombi's population was 849 in 180 households, when it was a village in Bahmai-ye Garmsiri-ye Shomali Rural District of Bahmai-ye Garmsiri District. (Note: Renamed Sar Asiab-e Yusefi District) The following census in 2011 counted 705 people in 166 households. The 2016 census measured the population of the village as 668 people in 156 households. It was the most populous village in its rural district.

After the census, the rural district was separated from the district in the formation of Mombi District. Qaleh Mombi was elevated to the status of a city.
