= Cheshmeh Rugheni =

Cheshmeh Rugheni چشمه روغني
- Village
- Location within Iran
- Coordinates: 31°32′51″N 49°42′03″E
- Country: Iran
- Province: Khuzestan
- County: Bagh-e Malek
- Bakhsh: Central
- Rural District: Rud Zard

Population (2006)
  - Total: 70
- Time zone: UTC+3:30 (IRST)
  - Summer (DST): UTC+4:30 (IRDT)

Cheshmeh Rugheni (Persian: چشمه روغني, also Romanized as Cheshmeh Rūghenī, Chashmeh Rowghanī, Chashmeh Rugheni, Cheshmeh Roghanī, Cheshmeh Rowghanī, and Cheshmeh-ye Rowghanī; also known as Bunneh Chashmeh Rughāni) is a village in Rud Zard Rural District, in the Central District of Bagh-e Malek County, Khuzestan Province, Iran. At the 2006 census, its population was 70, in 15 families.
