= Seyyed Ali Mohammad =

Seyyed Ali Mohammad سيدعلي محمد
- Village
- Country: Iran
- Province: Khuzestan
- County: Bagh-e Malek
- Bakhsh: Central
- Rural District: Rud Zard

Population (2006)
  - Total: 25
- Time zone: UTC+3:30 (IRST)
  - Summer (DST): UTC+4:30 (IRDT)

Seyyed Ali Mohammad (Persian: سيدعلي محمد, also Romanized as Seyyed ʿAlī Moḩammad) is a village in Rud Zard Rural District, in the Central District of Bagh-e Malek County, Khuzestan Province, Iran. At the 2006 census, its population was 25, in 7 families.
