= Ali Asgari =

Ali Asgari may refer to:

- Ali Asgari (director), Iranian filmmaker
- Ali-Reza Asgari, Iranian general
- Ali Asgari, Iran, a village
- Davood Ali Asgari, birth name of Locksmith (rapper)
