= Sar Asiab-e Yusefi =

City in Kohgiluyeh and Boyer-Ahmad province, Iran

Sar Asiab-e Yusefi Persian: سراسياب يوسفي
- City
- Location within Iran
- Coordinates: 31°02′13″N 50°13′03″E
- Country: Iran
- Province: Kohgiluyeh and Boyer-Ahmad
- County: Bahmai
- District: Sar Asiab-e Yusefi

Population (2016)
  - Total: 984
- Time zone: UTC+3:30 (IRST)

Sar Asiab-e Yusefi (Persian: سراسياب يوسفي) (Note: Also romanized as Sar Āsīāb-e Yūsefī; also known as Sar Āsīāb) is a city in, and the capital of, Sar Asiab-e Yusefi District (Note: Formerly Bahmai-ye Garmsiri District) of Bahmai County, Kohgiluyeh and Boyer-Ahmad province, Iran. As a village, it was the capital of Sar Asiab-e Yusefi Rural District until its capital was transferred to the village of Deh-e Bonar-e Yusefi.

== Demographics ==
=== Population ===
At the time of the 2006 National Census, Sar Asiab-e Yusefi's population was 1,015 in 191 households, when it was a village in Sar Asiab-e Yusefi Rural District. The following census in 2011 counted 1,025 people in 254 households. The 2016 census measured the population of the village as 984 people in 274 households. It was the most populous village in its rural district.

After the census, Sar Asiab-e Yusefi was elevated to the status of a city.
