= Shah Wali Khan =

Shah Wali Khan may refer to:

- Sardar Shah Wali Khan (1888–1977), a political and military figure of Afghanistan
- Shawali Khan (born around 1963), a former Guantanamo detainee from Afghanistan

== See also ==
- Shahvali (disambiguation)
