= Ab Lashkar-e Olya =

Ab Lashkar-e Olya اب لشكرعليا
- Village
- Location within Iran
- Coordinates: 31°35′00″N 49°41′44″E
- Country: Iran
- Province: Khuzestan
- County: Bagh-e Malek
- Bakhsh: Central
- Rural District: Rud Zard

Population (2006)
  - Total: 169
- Time zone: UTC+3:30 (IRST)
  - Summer (DST): UTC+4:30 (IRDT)

Ab Lashkar-e Olya (Persian: اب لشكرعليا, also Romanized as Āb Lashkar-e 'Olyā; also known as 'Āb-e Lashkar, Āb Lashgar, Āb Lashgar-e 'Olyá, Āb Lashgar 'Olyá, and Bunneh Āb-i-Lashkar) is a village in Rud Zard Rural District, in the Central District of Bagh-e Malek County, Khuzestan province, Iran. At the 2006 census, its population was 169, in 40 families.
