= Ab Lashkar-e Vosta =

Ab Lashkar-e Vosta اب لشكروسطي
- Village
- Location within Iran
- Coordinates: 31°35′00″N 49°41′00″E
- Country: Iran
- Province: Khuzestan
- County: Bagh-e Malek
- Bakhsh: Central
- Rural District: Rud Zard

Population (2006)
  - Total: 32
- Time zone: UTC+3:30 (IRST)
  - Summer (DST): UTC+4:30 (IRDT)

Ab Lashkar-e Vosta (Persian: اب لشكروسطي, also Romanized as Āb Lashkar-e Vosţá; also known as Āb Lashgar-e Vosţá) is a village in Rud Zard Rural District, in the Central District of Bagh-e Malek County, Khuzestan province, Iran. At the 2006 census, its population was 32, in 8 families.

The village sits at an elevation of 612 m (2,008 ft) above sea level and is around 485 km (301 mi) from Tehran, the country's capital.
