= Rud Zard-e Kayed Rafi =

Village in Khuzestan province, Iran

Rud Zard-e Kayed Rafi Persian: رودزردكايدرفيع
- Village
- Location within Iran
- Coordinates: 31°30′06″N 49°45′53″E
- Country: Iran
- Province: Khuzestan
- County: Bagh-e Malek
- District: Central
- Rural District: Rud Zard

Population (2016)
  - Total: 21
- Time zone: UTC+3:30 (IRST)

Rud Zard-e Kayed Rafi (Persian: رودزردكايدرفيع) (Note: Also romanized as Rūd Zard-e Kāyed Rafī‘; also known as Rood Zard, Rūd Zard, Rūd Zard-e Kārafī, and Rūd-e Zard) is a village in, and the capital of, Rud Zard Rural District of the Central District of Bagh-e Malek County, Khuzestan province, Iran.

== Demographics ==
=== Population ===
At the time of the 2006 National Census, the village's population was 92 in 21 households. The following census in 2011 counted 24 people in 9 households. The 2016 census measured the population of the village as 21 people in 9 households.
