= Likak =

City in Kohgiluyeh and Boyer-Ahmad province, Iran

Likak Persian: ليکک
- City
- Location within Iran
- Coordinates: 30°53′34″N 50°05′34″E
- Country: Iran
- Province: Kohgiluyeh and Boyer-Ahmad
- County: Bahmai
- District: Central

Population (2016)
  - Total: 19,857
- Time zone: UTC+3:30 (IRST)

Likak (Persian: ليکک (Note: Also romanized as Līkak; also known as: Lak Lak, Lakak, Līkak-e Bahmanī (لیکک بهمنی), Līrkak, Qaleh Likak (قَلعِۀ ليکک), also romanized as Qal‘eh-i-Likak and Qal‘eh-ye Līkak (Fort Likak); and Seh Laklak) is a city in the Central District of Bahmai County, Kohgiluyeh and Boyer-Ahmad province, Iran, serving as capital of both the county and the district. It was the administrative center for Bahmai-ye Garmsiri-ye Jonubi Rural District until its capital was transferred to the village of Kat.

== Demographics ==
=== Population ===
At the time of the 2006 National Census, the city's population was 12,226 in 2,201 households. The following census in 2011 counted 17,007 people in 3,774 households. The 2016 census measured the population of the city as 19,857 people in 5,091 households.
