= Takht-e Kabud Nargesi =

Village in Khuzestan province, Iran

Takht-e Kabud Nargesi Persian: تخت كبودنرگسي
- Village
- Location within Iran
- Coordinates: 31°40′08″N 49°39′55″E
- Country: Iran
- Province: Khuzestan
- County: Bagh-e Malek
- District: Central
- Rural District: Rud Zard

Population (2016)
  - Total: 897
- Time zone: UTC+3:30 (IRST)

Takht-e Kabud Nargesi (Persian: تخت كبودنرگسي) (Note: Also romanized as Takht-e Kabūd Nargesī; also known as Nargesī-ye Takht-e Kabūd, Takht Kabūd, Takht-e Kabūd, and Takht-e Kabūd Āsmārī) is a village in Rud Zard Rural District of the Central District of Bagh-e Malek County, Khuzestan province, Iran.

== Demographics ==
=== Population ===
At the time of the 2006 National Census, the village's population was 1,231 in 219 households. The following census in 2011 counted 1,196 people in 258 households. The 2016 census measured the population of the village as 897 people in 236 households. It was the most populous village in its rural district.
