= Ab Alvan Rural District =

Rural district in Kohgiluyeh and Boyer-Ahmad province, Iran

Ab Alvan Rural District Persian: دهستان آب الوان
- Rural District
- Location within Iran
- Coordinates: 31°01′N 50°11′E
- Country: Iran
- Province: Kohgiluyeh and Boyer-Ahmad
- County: Bahmai
- District: Sar Asiab-e Yusefi
- Capital: Ab Alvan
- Time zone: UTC+3:30 (IRST)

Ab Alvan Rural District (Persian: دهستان آب الوان) is in Sar Asiab-e Yusefi District (Note: Formerly Bahmai-ye Garmsiri District) of Bahmai County, Kohgiluyeh and Boyer-Ahmad province, Iran. Its capital is the village of Ab Alvan, whose population at the time of the 2016 National Census was 253 in 59 households.

== History ==
After the 2016 census, Ab Alvan Rural District was created in Sar Asiab-e Yusefi District.
