= Ab Lashkar-e Sofla =

Ab Lashkar-e Sofla اب لشكرسفلي
- Village
- Location within Iran
- Coordinates: 31°34′52″N 49°41′15″E
- Country: Iran
- Province: Khuzestan
- County: Bagh-e Malek
- Bakhsh: Central
- Rural District: Rud Zard

Population (2006)
  - Total: 19
- Time zone: UTC+3:30 (IRST)
  - Summer (DST): UTC+4:30 (IRDT)

Ab Lashkar-e Sofla (Persian: اب لشكرسفلي, also Romanized as Āb Lashkar-e Soflá; also known as Āb Lashgar-e Soflá and Āb Lashgar Soflá) is a village in Rud Zard Rural District, in the Central District of Bagh-e Malek County, Khuzestan province, Iran. At the 2006 census, its population was 19, in 5 families.
