= Kelasmadin-e Yek =

Kelasmadin-e Yek كلاسمدين يك
- Village
- Location within Iran
- Coordinates: 31°29′54″N 49°45′50″E
- Country: Iran
- Province: Khuzestan
- County: Bagh-e Malek
- Bakhsh: Central
- Rural District: Rud Zard

Population (2006)
  - Total: 23
- Time zone: UTC+3:30 (IRST)
  - Summer (DST): UTC+4:30 (IRDT)

Kelasmadin-e Yek (Persian: كلاسمدين يك, also Romanized as Kelāsmadīn-e Yek) is a village in Rud Zard Rural District, in the Central District of Bagh-e Malek County, Khuzestan Province, Iran. At the 2006 census, its population was 23, in 7 families.
