= Delli-ye Solmavand =

Delli-ye Solmavand دلي سلماوند
- Village
- Country: Iran
- Province: Khuzestan
- County: Bagh-e Malek
- Bakhsh: Central
- Rural District: Rud Zard

Population (2006)
  - Total: 77
- Time zone: UTC+3:30 (IRST)
  - Summer (DST): UTC+4:30 (IRDT)

Delli-ye Solmavand (Persian: دلي سلماوند, also Romanized as Dellī-ye Solmāvand) is a village in Rud Zard Rural District, in the Central District of Bagh-e Malek County, Khuzestan Province, Iran. At the 2006 census, its population was 77, in 22 families.
