= Talkheh Dan-e Bozorg Amirabad =

Talkheh Dan-e Bozorg Amirabad تلخه دان بزرگ اميراباد
- Village
- Location within Iran
- Coordinates: 30°34′27″N 51°29′18″E
- Country: Iran
- Province: Kohgiluyeh and Boyer-Ahmad
- County: Boyer-Ahmad
- Bakhsh: Central
- Rural District: Dasht-e Rum

Population (2006)
  - Total: 306
- Time zone: UTC+3:30 (IRST)
  - Summer (DST): UTC+4:30 (IRDT)

Talkheh Dan-e Bozorg Amirabad (Persian: تلخه دان بزرگ اميراباد, also Romanized as Talkheh Dān-e Bozorg Amīrābād; also known as Talkh Dān) is a village in Dasht-e Rum Rural District, in the Central District of Boyer-Ahmad County, Kohgiluyeh and Boyer-Ahmad Province, Iran. At the 2006 census, its population was 306, in 57 families.
