= Talkheh Dan-e Jowkar =

Talkheh Dan-e Jowkar تلخه دان جوكار
- Village
- Location within Iran
- Coordinates: 31°05′25″N 50°54′06″E
- Country: Iran
- Province: Kohgiluyeh and Boyer-Ahmad
- County: Boyer-Ahmad
- Bakhsh: Margown
- Rural District: Margown

Population (2006)
  - Total: 118
- Time zone: UTC+3:30 (IRST)
  - Summer (DST): UTC+4:30 (IRDT)

Talkheh Dan-e Jowkar (Persian: تلخه دان جوكار, also Romanized as Talkheh Dān-e Jowkār; also known as Talkheh Dūn) is a village in Margown Rural District, Margown District, Boyer-Ahmad County, Kohgiluyeh and Boyer-Ahmad Province, Iran. At the 2006 census, its population was 118, in 28 families.
