= Sartuf-e Delik =

Sartuf-e Delik سرطوف دليك
- Village
- Location within Iran
- Coordinates: 30°58′29″N 50°36′23″E
- Country: Iran
- Province: Kohgiluyeh and Boyer-Ahmad
- County: Kohgiluyeh
- Bakhsh: Central
- Rural District: Doshman Ziari

Population (2006)
  - Total: 29
- Time zone: UTC+3:30 (IRST)
  - Summer (DST): UTC+4:30 (IRDT)

Sartuf-e Delik (Persian: سرطوف دليك, also Romanized as Sartūf-e Delīk; also known as Sar Ţūf and Sartūf) is a village in Doshman Ziari Rural District, in the Central District of Kohgiluyeh County, Kohgiluyeh and Boyer-Ahmad Province, Iran. At the 2006 census, its population was 29, in 4 families.
