= Qeshlaq-e Shah Vali =

Qeshlaq-e Shah Vali قشلاق شاه ولي
- Village
- Location within Iran
- Coordinates: 39°17′00″N 47°21′39″E
- Country: Iran
- Province: East Azerbaijan
- County: Kaleybar
- Bakhsh: Abish Ahmad
- Rural District: Qeshlaq

Population (2006)
  - Total: 217
- Time zone: UTC+3:30 (IRST)
  - Summer (DST): UTC+4:30 (IRDT)

Qeshlaq-e Shah Vali (Persian: قشلاق شاه ولي, also Romanized as Qeshlāq-e Shāh Valī; also known as Shāh Valī) is a village in Qeshlaq Rural District, Abish Ahmad District, Kaleybar County, East Azerbaijan Province, Iran. At the 2006 census, its population was 217, in 41 families.
