= Shah Vali, Shadegan =

Shah Vali شاه ولي
- Village
- Location within Iran
- Coordinates: 30°39′26″N 48°38′12″E
- Country: Iran
- Province: Khuzestan
- County: Shadegan
- Bakhsh: Central
- Rural District: Jaffal

Population (2006)
  - Total: 1,114
- Time zone: UTC+3:30 (IRST)
  - Summer (DST): UTC+4:30 (IRDT)

Shah Vali (Persian: شاه ولي, also Romanized as Shāh Valī; also known as Shāh Valī-ye Soflá) is a village in Jaffal Rural District, in the Central District of Shadegan County, Khuzestan Province, Iran. At the 2006 census, its population was 1,114, in 195 families.
