= Narmun, Fars =

Narmun نرمون
- Village
- Location within Iran
- Coordinates: 30°11′38″N 51°22′33″E
- Country: Iran
- Province: Fars
- County: Mamasani
- Bakhsh: Central
- Rural District: Bakesh-e Do

Population (2006)
  - Total: 325
- Time zone: UTC+3:30 (IRST)
  - Summer (DST): UTC+4:30 (IRDT)

Narmun (Persian: نرمون, also Romanized as Narmūn; also known as Narmān Bardengān) is a village in Bakesh-e Do Rural District, in the Central District of Mamasani County, Fars province, Iran. At the 2006 census, its population was 325, in 64 families.
