= Dowpar-e Qabr-e Kiamars =

Dowpar-e Qabr-e Kiamars دوپرقبركيامرث
- Village
- Location within Iran
- Coordinates: 30°44′11″N 50°30′35″E
- Country: Iran
- Province: Kohgiluyeh and Boyer-Ahmad
- County: Kohgiluyeh
- Bakhsh: Central
- Rural District: Dehdasht-e Gharbi

Population (2006)
  - Total: 38
- Time zone: UTC+3:30 (IRST)
  - Summer (DST): UTC+4:30 (IRDT)

Dowpar-e Qabr-e Kiamars (Persian: دوپرقبركيامرث, also Romanized as Dowpar-e Qabr-e Kīāmars̱; also known as Do Par and Dowpar-e Qabr) is a village in Dehdasht-e Gharbi Rural District, in the Central District of Kohgiluyeh County, Kohgiluyeh and Boyer-Ahmad Province, Iran. At the 2006 census, its population was 38, in seven families.
