= Shahvali, Lorestan =

Shahvali شاه ولي
- Village
- Location within Iran
- Coordinates: 34°19′23″N 47°46′35″E
- Country: Iran
- Province: Lorestan
- County: Delfan
- Bakhsh: Kakavand
- Rural District: Kakavand-e Sharqi

Population (2006)
  - Total: 19
- Time zone: UTC+3:30 (IRST)
  - Summer (DST): UTC+4:30 (IRDT)

Shahvali (Persian: شاه ولي, also Romanized as Shāhvalī; also known as Shādvalī) is a village in Kakavand-e Sharqi Rural District, Kakavand District, Delfan County, Lorestan Province, Iran. At the 2006 census, its population was 19, in 5 families.
