= Sar Tuf, Khuzestan =

Sar Tuf سرتوف
- Village
- Location within Iran
- Coordinates: 31°36′06″N 50°17′39″E
- Country: Iran
- Province: Khuzestan
- County: Izeh
- Bakhsh: Dehdez
- Rural District: Donbaleh Rud-e Jonubi

Population (2006)
  - Total: 51
- Time zone: UTC+3:30 (IRST)
  - Summer (DST): UTC+4:30 (IRDT)

Sar Tuf (Persian: سرتوف, also Romanized as Sar Tūf; also known as Sargūf) is a village in Donbaleh Rud-e Jonubi Rural District, Dehdez District, Izeh County, Khuzestan Province, Iran. At the 2006 census, its population was 51, in 7 families.
