= Shah Vali, Kermanshah =

Shah Vali شاه ولي
- Village
- Location within Iran
- Coordinates: 33°50′47″N 47°01′55″E
- Country: Iran
- Province: Kermanshah
- County: Kermanshah
- Bakhsh: Firuzabad
- Rural District: Jalalvand

Population (2006)
  - Total: 44
- Time zone: UTC+3:30 (IRST)
  - Summer (DST): UTC+4:30 (IRDT)

Shah Vali (Persian: شاه ولي, also romanized as Shāh Valī; also known as Qabr Bābā and Qīr-e Bābā Shāh Valī) is a village in Jalalvand Rural District, Firuzabad District, Kermanshah County, Kermanshah Province, Iran. At the 2006 census, its population was 44, in 9 families.
