= Talkhehdan, Chaharmahal and Bakhtiari =

تلخدان تلخدان
- Village
- Location within Iran
- Coordinates: 32°07′53″N 50°04′07″E
- Country: Iran
- Province: Chaharmahal and Bakhtiari
- County: Kuhrang
- Bakhsh: Bazoft
- Rural District: Doab

Population (2006)
  - Total: 209
- Time zone: UTC+3:30 (IRST)
  - Summer (DST): UTC+4:30 (IRDT)

Talkhehdan (Persian: تلخه دان, also Romanized as Talkhehdān) is a village in Doab Rural District, Bazoft District, Kuhrang County, Chaharmahal and Bakhtiari Province, Iran. At the 2006 census, its population was 209, in 35 families. The village is populated by Lurs.
