= Shah Wali Ullah Nagar =

Coordinates: 24°58′N 66°57′E

Shah Wali Ullah Nagar (Urdu: شاه ولی الله نگر) is a neighborhood in Orangi Town in Karachi, Sindh, Pakistan.

There are several ethnic groups including Muhajirs, Sindhis, Kashmiris, Punjabis, Pakhtuns, Balochis, Memons, Bohras and Ismailis.

This neighbourhood is named in the honour of Qutb-ud-Dīn Ahmad ibn 'Abdul Rahīm (Arabic: قطب الدین احمد ابن عبدالرحیم), also known as Shāh Walīullāh and Shāh WalĪ Allāh (1703–1762 CE / 1114–1176 AH) was an Islamic scholar, reformer and founder of modern Islamic thought who attempted to reassess Islamic theology in the light of modern changes.
