= Badamlu, East Azerbaijan =

Badamlu باداملو
- Village
- Location within Iran
- Coordinates: 37°02′20″N 46°28′25″E
- Country: Iran
- Province: East Azerbaijan
- County: Maragheh
- Bakhsh: Saraju
- Rural District: Quri Chay-ye Gharbi

Population (2006)
  - Total: 74
- Time zone: UTC+3:30 (IRST)
  - Summer (DST): UTC+4:30 (IRDT)

Badamlu (Persian: باداملو, also Romanized as Bādāmlū) is a village in Quri Chay-ye Gharbi Rural District, Saraju District, Maragheh County, East Azerbaijan Province, Iran. At the 2006 census, its population was 74, in 19 families.
