= Shah Vali, Kurdistan =

Shah Vali شاه ولي
- Village
- Location within Iran
- Coordinates: 36°06′58″N 46°57′17″E
- Country: Iran
- Province: Kurdistan
- County: Divandarreh
- Bakhsh: Karaftu
- Rural District: Zarrineh

Population (2006)
  - Total: 241
- Time zone: UTC+3:30 (IRST)
  - Summer (DST): UTC+4:30 (IRDT)

Shah Vali (Persian: شاه ولي, also Romanized as Shāh Valī and Shāhvalī) is a village in Zarrineh Rural District, Karaftu District, Divandarreh County, Kurdistan Province, Iran. At the 2006 census, its population was 241, in 48 families. The village is populated by Kurds.
