= Badamuiyeh =

Badamuiyeh باداموئيه
- Village
- Location within Iran
- Coordinates: 30°20′34″N 56°45′59″E
- Country: Iran
- Province: Kerman
- County: Kerman
- Bakhsh: Central
- Rural District: Ekhtiarabad

Population (2006)
  - Total: 334
- Time zone: UTC+3:30 (IRST)

Badamuiyeh (Persian: باداموئيه, also Romanized as Bādāmū’īyeh; also known as Bādāman, Bādāmīyeh, Bādāmlū, and Badammo’iyeh) is a village in Ekhtiarabad Rural District, in the Central District of Kerman County, Kerman Province, Iran. At the 2006 census, its population was 334, in 96 families.
