= Mombi District =

District in Kohgiluyeh and Boyer-Ahmad province, Iran

Mombi District Persian: بخش ممبی
- District
- Location within Iran
- Coordinates: 31°09′41″N 50°05′31″E
- Country: Iran
- Province: Kohgiluyeh and Boyer-Ahmad
- County: Bahmai
- Capital: Qaleh Mombi
- Time zone: UTC+3:30 (IRST)

Mombi District (Persian: بخش ممبی) is in Bahmai County, Kohgiluyeh and Boyer-Ahmad province, Iran. Its capital is the city of Qaleh Mombi, whose population at the time of the 2016 National Census 668 people in 156 households.

== History ==
After the 2016 census, Bahmai-ye Garmsiri-ye Shomali Rural District was separated from Bahmai-ye Garmsiri District in the formation of Mombi District. The village of Qaleh Mombi was elevated to the status of a city.

== Demographics ==
=== Administrative divisions ===
Mombi District
Administrative Divisions
Bahmai-ye Garmsiri-ye Shomali RD
Rudtalkh RD
Qaleh Mombi (city) (Note: Became a city after the 2016 census)
RD = Rural District
