= Kafsh Kanan Rural District =

Rural district in Kohgiluyeh and Boyer-Ahmad province, Iran

Kafsh Kanan Rural District Persian: دهستان كفش كنان
- Rural District
- Location within Iran
- Coordinates: 30°46′19″N 50°19′13″E
- Country: Iran
- Province: Kohgiluyeh and Boyer-Ahmad
- County: Bahmai
- District: Central
- Capital: Kafsh Kanan

Population (2016)
  - Total: 1,384
- Time zone: UTC+3:30 (IRST)

Kafsh Kanan Rural District (Persian: دهستان كفش كنان) is in the Central District of Bahmai County, Kohgiluyeh and Boyer-Ahmad province, Iran. Its capital is the village of Kafsh Kanan.

== Demographics ==
=== Population ===
At the time of the 2006 National Census, the rural district's population was 1,679 in 334 households. There were 1,700 inhabitants in 432 households at the following census of 2011. The 2016 census measured the population of the rural district as 1,384 in 402 households. The most populous of its 23 villages was Shahrak-e Vali-ye Asr, with 796 people.
