= Rud Zard Rural District =

Rural district in Khuzestan province, Iran

Rud Zard Rural District Persian: دهستان رودزرد
- Rural District
- Location within Iran
- Coordinates: 31°34′07″N 49°41′01″E
- Country: Iran
- Province: Khuzestan
- County: Bagh-e Malek
- District: Central
- Capital: Rud Zard-e Kayed Rafi

Population (2016)
  - Total: 2,283
- Time zone: UTC+3:30 (IRST)

Rud Zard Rural District (Persian: دهستان رودزرد) is in the Central District of Bagh-e Malek County, Khuzestan province, Iran. Its capital is the village of Rud Zard-e Kayed Rafi.

== Demographics ==
=== Population ===
At the time of the 2006 National Census, the rural district's population was 3,204 in 689 households. There were 2,812 inhabitants in 651 households at the following census of 2011. The 2016 census measured the population of the rural district as 2,283 in 640 households. The most populous of its 53 villages was Takht-e Kabud Nargesi, with 897 people.
