= Sar Asiab-e Yusefi Rural District =

Rural district in Kohgiluyeh and Boyer-Ahmad province, Iran

Sar Asiab-e Yusefi Rural District Persian: دهستان سرآسياب يوسفي
- Rural District
- Location within Iran
- Coordinates: 31°05′N 50°11′E
- Country: Iran
- Province: Kohgiluyeh and Boyer-Ahmad
- County: Bahmai
- District: Sar Asiab-e Yusefi
- Capital: Deh-e Bonar-e Yusefi

Population (2016)
  - Total: 3,252
- Time zone: UTC+3:30 (IRST)

Sar Asiab-e Yusefi Rural District (Persian: دهستان سرآسياب يوسفي) is in Sar Asiab-e Yusefi District (Note: Formerly Bahmai-ye Garmsiri District) of Bahmai County, Kohgiluyeh and Boyer-Ahmad province, Iran. Its capital is the village of Deh-e Bonar-e Yusefi. The previous capital of the rural district was the village of Sar Asiab-e Yusefi, now a city.

== Demographics ==
=== Population ===
At the time of the 2006 National Census, the rural district's population was 5,145 in 1,021 households. There were 4,217 inhabitants in 1,001 households at the following census of 2011. The 2016 census measured the population of the rural district as 3,252 in 890 households. The most populous of its 53 villages was Sar Asiab-e Yusefi (now a city), with 984 people.
