= Bahmai-ye Garmsiri-ye Jonubi Rural District =

Rural district in Kohgiluyeh and Boyer-Ahmad province, Iran

Bahmai-ye Garmsiri-ye Jonubi Rural District Persian: دهستان بهمئي گرمسيرئ جنوبي
- Rural District
- Location within Iran
- Coordinates: 30°59′28″N 50°06′45″E
- Country: Iran
- Province: Kohgiluyeh and Boyer-Ahmad
- County: Bahmai
- District: Central
- Capital: Kat

Population (2016)
  - Total: 7,083
- Time zone: UTC+3:30 (IRST)

Bahmai-ye Garmsiri-ye Jonubi Rural District (Persian: دهستان بهمئي گرمسيرئ جنوبي) is in the Central District of Bahmai County, Kohgiluyeh and Boyer-Ahmad province, Iran. Its capital is the village of Kat. The rural district was previously administered from the city of Likak.

== Demographics ==
=== Population ===
At the time of the 2006 National Census, the rural district's population was 8,288 in 1,550 households. There were 7,600 inhabitants in 1,805 households at the following census of 2011. The 2016 census measured the population of the rural district as 7,083 in 1,880 households. The most populous of its 69 villages was Gach Boland, with 766 people.
