= Central District (Bahmai County) =

District in Kohgiluyeh and Boyer-Ahmad province, Iran

Central District (Bahmai County) Persian: بخش مرکزی شهرستان بهمئی
- District
- Location within Iran
- Coordinates: 30°55′46″N 50°08′53″E
- Country: Iran
- Province: Kohgiluyeh and Boyer-Ahmad
- County: Bahmai
- Established: 2004
- Capital: Likak

Population (2016)
  - Total: 28,324
- Time zone: UTC+3:30 (IRST)

The Central District of Bahmai County (Persian: بخش مرکزی شهرستان بهمئی) is in Kohgiluyeh and Boyer-Ahmad province, Iran. Its capital is the city of Likak.

== Demographics ==
=== Population ===
At the time of the 2006 National Census, the district's population was 22,193 in 4,085 households. The following census in 2011 counted 26,307 people in 6,011 households. The 2016 census measured the population of the district as 28,324 inhabitants in 7,373 households.

=== Administrative divisions ===
Central District (Bahmai County) Population
Administrative Divisions	2006	2011	2016
Bahmai-ye Garmsiri-ye Jonubi RD	8,288	7,600	7,083
Kafsh Kanan RD	1,679	1,700	1,384
Likak (city)	12,226	17,007	19,857
Total	22,193	26,307	28,324
RD = Rural District
