= Bahmai-ye Garmsiri-ye Shomali Rural District =

Rural district in Kohgiluyeh and Boyer-Ahmad province, Iran

Bahmai-ye Garmsiri-ye Shomali Rural District Persian: دهستان بهمئي گرمسيرئ شمالي
- Rural District
- Location within Iran
- Coordinates: 31°08′52″N 50°08′14″E
- Country: Iran
- Province: Kohgiluyeh and Boyer-Ahmad
- County: Bahmai
- District: Mombi
- Capital: Gerd-e Kuchak

Population (2016)
  - Total: 6,150
- Time zone: UTC+3:30 (IRST)

Bahmai-ye Garmsiri-ye Shomali Rural District (Persian: دهستان بهمئي گرمسيرئ شمالي) is in Mombi District of Bahmai County, Kohgiluyeh and Boyer-Ahmad province, Iran. Its capital is the village of Gerd-e Kuchak. The previous capital of the rural district was the village of Qaleh Mombi, now a city.

== Demographics ==
=== Population ===
At the time of the 2006 National Census, the rural district's population (as a part of Bahmai-ye Garmsiri District (Note: Renamed Sar Asiab-e Yusefi District)) was 7,729 in 1,477 households. There were 6,524 inhabitants in 1,534 households at the following census of 2011. The 2016 census measured the population of the rural district as 6,150 in 1,646 households. The most populous of its 82 villages was Qaleh Mombi (now a city), with 668 people.

After the census, the rural district was separated from the district in the formation of Mombi District.
