= Sar Asiab-e Yusefi District =

District in Kohgiluyeh and Boyer-Ahmad province, Iran

Sar Asiab-e Yusefi District Persian: بخش سرآسیاب یوسفی
- District
- Location within Iran
- Coordinates: 31°03′51″N 50°11′02″E
- Country: Iran
- Province: Kohgiluyeh and Boyer-Ahmad
- County: Bahmai
- Capital: Sar Asiab-e Yusefi

Population (2016)
  - Total: 9,402
- Time zone: UTC+3:30 (IRST)

Sar Asiab-e Yusefi District (Persian: بخش سرآسیاب یوسفی) (Note: Formerly Bahmai-ye Garmsiri District) is in Bahmai County, Kohgiluyeh and Boyer-Ahmad province, Iran. Its capital is the city of Sar Asiab-e Yusefi.

== History ==
After the 2016 National Census, the district was renamed Sar Asiab-e Yusefi District. The village of Sar Asiab-e Yusefi was elevated to the status of a city.

== Demographics ==
=== Population ===
At the time of the 2006 census, the district's population (as Bahmai-ye Garmsiri District) was 12,874 in 2,498 households. The following census in 2011 counted 10,741 people in 2,535 households. The 2016 census measured the population of the district as 9,402 inhabitants in 2,536 households.

=== Administrative divisions ===
Sar Asiab-e Yusefi District Population
| Administrative Divisions | 2006 | 2011 | 2016 |
|---|---|---|---|
| Ab Alvan RD (Note: Established after the 2016 census) | | | |
| Bahmai-ye Garmsiri-ye Shomali RD (Note: Transferred to Mombi District after the 2016 census) | 7,729 | 6,524 | 6,150 |
| Sar Asiab-e Yusefi RD | 5,145 | 4,217 | 3,252 |
| Sar Asiab-e Yusefi (city) (Note: Became a city after the 2016 census) | | | |
| Total | 12,874 | 10,741 | 9,402 |
RD = Rural District
