= Bahmai County =

County in Kohgiluyeh and Boyer-Ahmad province, Iran

Bahmai County Persian: شهرستان بهمئی
- County
- Location of Bahmai County in Kohgiluyeh and Boyer-Ahmad province (left, pink)

- Location of Kohgiluyeh and Boyer-Ahmad province in Iran
- Coordinates: 30°59′N 50°09′E
- Country: Iran
- Province: Kohgiluyeh and Boyer-Ahmad
- Established: 2004
- Capital: Likak
- Districts: Central, Mombi, Sar Asiab-e Yusefi

Population (2016)
  - Total: 38,136
- Time zone: UTC+3:30 (IRST)

Bahmai County (Persian: شهرستان بهمئی) is in Kohgiluyeh and Boyer-Ahmad province, Iran. Its capital is the city of Likak.

== History ==
After the 2016 National Census, Bahmai-ye Garmsiri-ye Shomali Rural District was separated from Bahmai-ye Garmsiri District in the establishment of Mombi District, including the new Rudtalkh Rural District. Bahmai-ye Garmsiri District was renamed Sar Asiab-e Yusefi District, including the new Ab Alvan Rural District. The villages of Qaleh Mombi and Sar Asiab-e Yusefi were elevated to city status.

== Demographics ==
=== Population ===
At the time of the 2006 census, the county's population was 35,067 in 6,583 households. The following census in 2011 counted 37,048 people in 8,536 households. The 2016 census measured the population of the county as 38,136 in 10,028 households.

=== Administrative divisions ===
Bahmai County's population history and administrative structure over three consecutive censuses are shown in the following table.

Bahmai County Population
Administrative Divisions	2006	2011	2016
Central District	22,193	26,307	28,324
Bahmai-ye Garmsiri-ye Jonubi RD	8,288	7,600	7,083
Kafsh Kanan RD	1,679	1,700	1,384
Likak (city)	12,226	17,007	19,857
Mombi District (Note: Established after the 2016 census)			
Bahmai-ye Garmsiri-ye Shomali RD			
Rudtalkh RD			
Qaleh Mombi (city) (Note: Became a city after the 2016 census)			
Sar Asiab-e Yusefi District (Note: Formerly Bahmai-ye Garmsiri District)	12,874	10,741	9,402
Ab Alvan RD			
Bahmai-ye Garmsiri-ye Shomali RD	7,729	6,524	6,150
Sar Asiab-e Yusefi RD	5,145	4,217	3,252
Sar Asiab-e Yusefi (city)			
Total	35,067	37,048	38,136
RD = Rural District

== See also ==
Media related to Bahmai County at Wikimedia Commons
