= Ab Chenar =

Ab Chenar or Abchenar (Persian: اب چنار) may refer to various places in Iran:

- Ab Chenar, Chaharmahal and Bakhtiari
- Ab Chenar-e Olya, Chaharmahal and Bakhtiari Province
- Ab Chenar-e Sofla, Chaharmahal and Bakhtiari Province
- Ab Chenar, Fars
- Ab Chenar, Khuzestan
- Ab Chenar, Andika, Khuzestan Province
- Ab Chenar, Kohgiluyeh and Boyer-Ahmad
- Abchenar, Kohgiluyeh
- Ab Chenar-e Bid Anjir, Kohgiluyeh and Boyer-Ahmad Province

== See also ==
- Ab Chenaru (disambiguation)
- Ab Chendar (disambiguation)
