= Kamak =

Kamak or Kamek (Persian: كمك) may refer to various places in Iran:

- Kamak-e Olya, Hamadan Province
- Kamak-e Sofla, Hamadan Province
- Kamak, Kermanshah
- Kamak-e Azizollah, Kohgiluyeh and Boyer-Ahmad Province
- Kamak-e Gorg Ali, Kohgiluyeh and Boyer-Ahmad Province
- Kamak-e Khodadad, Kohgiluyeh and Boyer-Ahmad Province
- Kamak-e Khoda Rahem, Kohgiluyeh and Boyer-Ahmad Province
- Kamak-e Nad Ali, Kohgiluyeh and Boyer-Ahmad Province
- Kamak-e Rah Khoda, Kohgiluyeh and Boyer-Ahmad Province
- Kamak-e Safer, Kohgiluyeh and Boyer-Ahmad Province

== See also ==
- Gamaksan (Gyeonggi), also known as Kamak

Mountain during the Korean War
