= Badamestan =

Badamestan (Persian: بادامستان) may refer to:

- Badamestan-e Amid Ali, Chaharmahal and Bakhtiari Province
- Badamestan-e Aqajun, Chaharmahal and Bakhtiari Province
- Badamestan-e Mashhadiamir, Chaharmahal and Bakhtiari Province
- Badamestan-e Bala, Kerman Province
- Badamestan-e Pain, Kerman, Kerman Province
- Badamestan, Kohgiluyeh and Boyer-Ahmad
- Badamestan, Zanjan
- Badamestan-e Farvivand, Khuzestan Province
