= Ab Chendar =

Ab Chendar or Abchendar (Persian: اب چندار) may refer to various places in Iran:

- Ab Chendar, Abezhdan, Khuzestan Province
- Ab Chendar, Chelo, Khuzestan Province
- Ab Chendaran (disambiguation), Kohgiluyeh and Boyer-Ahmad Province
- Ab Chendar, Boyer-Ahmad, Kohgiluyeh and Boyer-Ahmad Province
- Ab Chendar, Charusa, Kohgiluyeh and Boyer-Ahmad Province
- Ab Chendar, Landeh, Kohgiluyeh and Boyer-Ahmad Province

== See also ==
- Ab Chenar (disambiguation)
