= Chalderaz =

Chalderaz or Chal Deraz or Chal-e Deraz (Persian: چال دراز or چالدراز) may refer to:

- Chalderaz-e Beytollah
- Chalderaz-e Esfandiyar
- Chalderaz-e Gholamali
- Chalderaz-e Hadi
- Chalderaz-e Yadollah
