= Silarestan (disambiguation) =

Silarestan is a village in Kohgiluyeh and Boyer-Ahmad Province, Iran.

Silarestan (Persian: سي لارستان) may also refer to:

- Silarestan-e Olya Dam Ludab, Kohgiluyeh and Boyer-Ahmad Province
- Silarestan-e Sofla Dam Ludab, Kohgiluyeh and Boyer-Ahmad Province
