= Sargar =

Sargar (Persian: سرگر) may refer to these places in Iran:

- Sargar Dangah
- Sargar-e Lir Tahrak
- Sargar-e Sasargun

== See also ==
- Sanket Sargar (born 2000), Indian weightlifter
- Sandip Sanjay Sargar, Indian para Olympian
