= Deh Sukhteh =

Deh Sukhteh or Deh-e Sukhteh (Persian: ده سوخته) may refer to:

- Deh Sukhteh, Falard, Chaharmahal and Bakhtiari Province
- Deh-e Sukhteh, Manj, Chaharmahal and Bakhtiari Province
- Deh Sukhteh, Kohgiluyeh and Boyer-Ahmad
