= Tall-e Deraz =

Tall-e Deraz تل دراز
- Village
- Location within Iran
- Coordinates: 30°57′27″N 50°54′22″E
- Country: Iran
- Province: Kohgiluyeh and Boyer-Ahmad
- County: Boyer-Ahmad
- Bakhsh: Ludab
- Rural District: Ludab

Population (2006)
  - Total: 426
- Time zone: UTC+3:30 (IRST)
  - Summer (DST): UTC+4:30 (IRDT)

Tall-e Deraz (Persian: تل دراز, also romanized as Tall-e Derāz; also known as Ţūl-e Derāz) is a village in Ludab Rural District, Ludab District, Boyer-Ahmad County, Kohgiluyeh and Boyer-Ahmad Province, Iran. In the 2006 census, its population was 426 people, and 81 families.
