= Ab Murd =

Ab Murd or Ab Moord or Ab Mowrd or Abmurd (Persian: ابمورد) may refer to:

- Ab Murd-e Dam Ludab
- Ab Murd-e Tangiar
