= Dasht Kun Kalamak Gelal =

Dasht Kun Kalamak Gelal دشتكون كلمك گلال
- Village
- Country: Iran
- Province: Kohgiluyeh and Boyer-Ahmad
- County: Boyer-Ahmad
- Bakhsh: Ludab
- Rural District: Chin

Population (2006)
  - Total: 31
- Time zone: UTC+3:30 (IRST)
  - Summer (DST): UTC+4:30 (IRDT)

Dasht Kun Kalamak Gelal (Persian: دشتكون كلمك گلال, also Romanized as Dasht Kūn Kalamak Gelāl) is a village in Chin Rural District, Ludab District, Boyer-Ahmad County, Kohgiluyeh and Boyer-Ahmad Province, Iran. At the 2006 census, its population was 31, in 4 families.
