= Ab Aspid Guzenan =

Ab Aspid Guzenan اب اسپيدگوزنان
- Village
- Country: Iran
- Province: Kohgiluyeh and Boyer-Ahmad
- County: Boyer-Ahmad
- Bakhsh: Ludab
- Rural District: Ludab

Population (2006)
  - Total: 60
- Time zone: UTC+3:30 (IRST)
  - Summer (DST): UTC+4:30 (IRDT)

Ab Aspid Guzenan (Persian: اب اسپيدگوزنان, also Romanized as Āb Āspīd Gūzenān) is a village in Ludab Rural District, Ludab District, Boyer-Ahmad County, Kohgiluyeh and Boyer-Ahmad province, Iran. At the 2006 census, its population was 60, in 12 families.
