= Miyanju =

Village in Chaharmahal and Bakhtiari province, Iran

Miyanju Persian: ميانجو
- Village
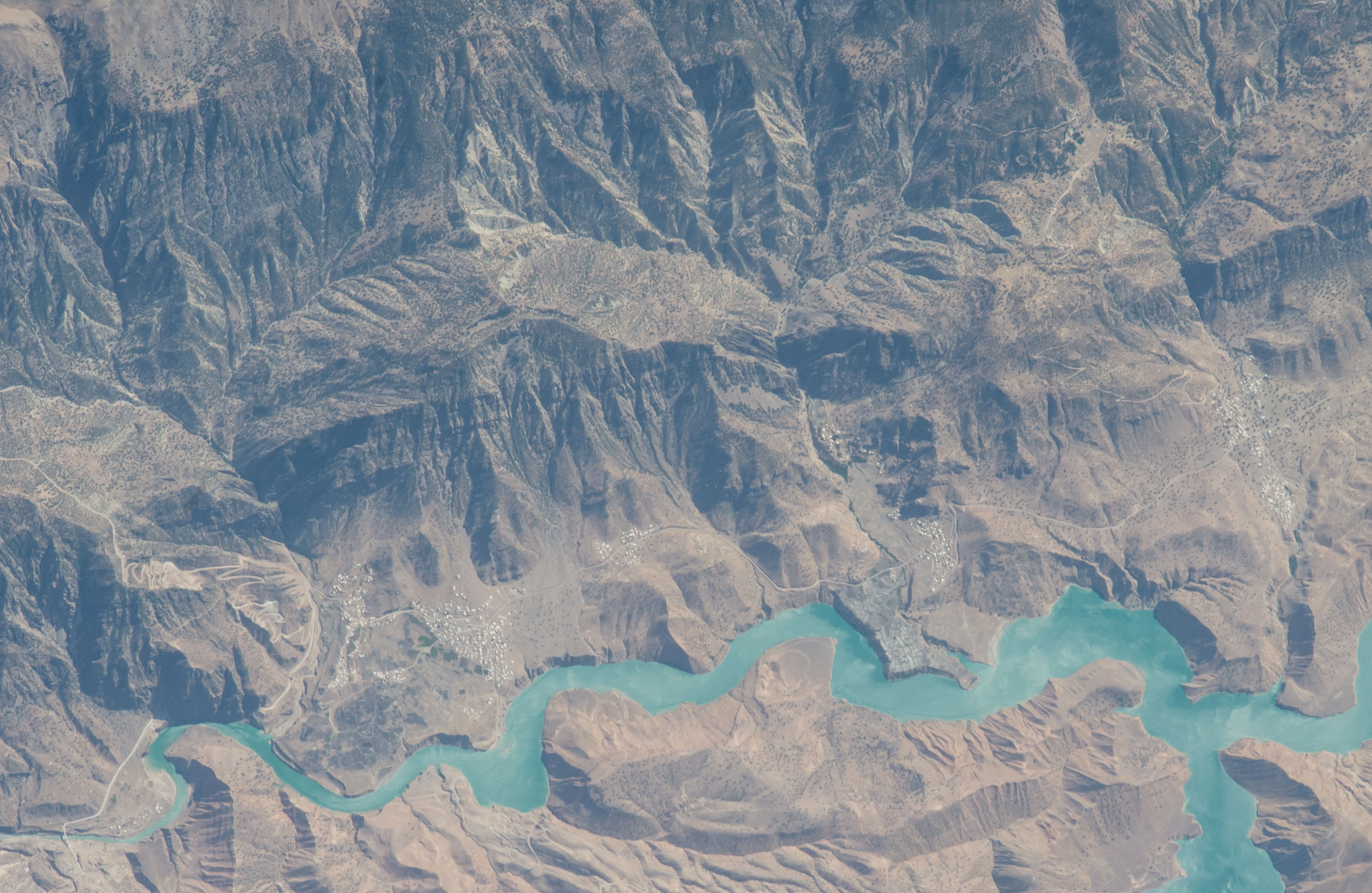
- Karun-3 Lake shore, road to town Izeh, villages Miyanju and Deh Now-ye Barez, landscape in Zagros Mountains

- Location within Iran
- Coordinates: 31°32′17″N 50°21′55″E
- Country: Iran
- Province: Chaharmahal and Bakhtiari
- County: Lordegan
- District: Manj
- Rural District: Barez

Population (2016)
  - Total: 527
- Time zone: UTC+3:30 (IRST)

Miyanju (Persian: ميانجو) (Note: Also romanized as Mīyānjū) is a village in Barez Rural District of Manj District in Lordegan County, Chaharmahal and Bakhtiari province, Iran.

== Demographics ==
=== Ethnicity ===
The village is populated by Lurs.

=== Population ===
At the time of the 2006 National Census, the village's population was 509 in 94 households. The following census in 2011 counted 483 people in 108 households. The 2016 census measured the population of the village as 527 people in 134 households.
