= Pas Tuk =

Pas Tuk پستوك
- Village
- Location within Iran
- Coordinates: 30°58′10″N 50°52′01″E
- Country: Iran
- Province: Kohgiluyeh and Boyer-Ahmad
- County: Boyer-Ahmad
- Bakhsh: Ludab
- Rural District: Ludab

Population (2006)
  - Total: 90
- Time zone: UTC+3:30 (IRST)
  - Summer (DST): UTC+4:30 (IRDT)

Pas Tuk (Persian: پستوك, also Romanized as Pas Tūk) is a village in Ludab Rural District, Ludab District, Boyer-Ahmad County, Kohgiluyeh and Boyer-Ahmad Province, Iran. At the 2006 census, its population was 90, in 22 families.
