= Sarvezg Darreh Bid =

Sarvezg Darreh Bid سروزگ دره بيد
- Village
- Country: Iran
- Province: Kohgiluyeh and Boyer-Ahmad
- County: Boyer-Ahmad
- Bakhsh: Ludab
- Rural District: Chin

Population (2006)
  - Total: 93
- Time zone: UTC+3:30 (IRST)
  - Summer (DST): UTC+4:30 (IRDT)

Sarvezg Darreh Bid (Persian: سروزگ دره بيد, also Romanized as Sarvezg Darreh Bīd) is a village in Chin Rural District, Ludab District, Boyer-Ahmad County, Kohgiluyeh and Boyer-Ahmad Province, Iran. At the 2006 census, its population was 93, in 24 families.
