= Nasrollah Jahan Bin =

Nasrollah Jahan Bin نصراله جهان بين
- Village
- Country: Iran
- Province: Kohgiluyeh and Boyer-Ahmad
- County: Boyer-Ahmad
- Bakhsh: Ludab
- Rural District: Ludab

Population (2006)
  - Total: 30
- Time zone: UTC+3:30 (IRST)
  - Summer (DST): UTC+4:30 (IRDT)

Nasrollah Jahan Bin (Persian: نصراله جهان بين, also Romanized as Naṣrollah Jahān Bīn) is a village in Ludab Rural District, Ludab District, Boyer-Ahmad County, Kohgiluyeh and Boyer-Ahmad Province, Iran. At the 2006 census, its population was 30, in 9 families.
