= Deh Chal-e Dam-e Ludab =

Deh Chal-e Dam-e Ludab ده چل دم لوداب
- Village
- Location within Iran
- Coordinates: 30°59′44″N 50°31′24″E
- Country: Iran
- Province: Kohgiluyeh and Boyer-Ahmad
- County: Boyer-Ahmad
- Bakhsh: Ludab
- Rural District: Ludab

Population (2006)
  - Total: 31
- Time zone: UTC+3:30 (IRST)
  - Summer (DST): UTC+4:30 (IRDT)

Deh Chal-e Dam-e Ludab (Persian: ده چل دم لوداب, also romanized as Deh Chāl-e Dam-e Lūdāb; also known as Deh Chāl) is a village in Ludab Rural District, Ludab District, Boyer-Ahmad County, Kohgiluyeh and Boyer-Ahmad Province, Iran. At the 2006 census, its population was 31, in 5 families.
