= Lah Farakh =

Lah Farakh or Lah Frakh (Persian: له فراخ) may refer to:

- Lah Farakh-e Mushemi
- Lah Frakh Melleh Namdaran
