= Gorgian =

Village in Boyer-Ahmad County, Iran

Gorgian گرگيان
- Village
- Location within Iran
- Coordinates: 30°59′14″N 50°51′44″E
- Country: Iran
- Province: Kohgiluyeh and Boyer-Ahmad
- County: Boyer-Ahmad
- Bakhsh: Ludab
- Rural District: Ludab

Population (2006)
  - Total: 134
- Time zone: UTC+3:30 (IRST)
  - Summer (DST): UTC+4:30 (IRDT)

Gorgian (Persian: گرگيان, also Romanized as Gorgīān; also known as Gorkīān) is a village in Ludab Rural District, Ludab District, Boyer-Ahmad County, Kohgiluyeh and Boyer-Ahmad Province, Iran. At the 2006 census, its population was 134, in 27 families.
