= Manj-e Baraftab =

Neighborhood in Chaharmahal and Bakhtiari province, Iran

Manj-e Baraftab Persian: منج برافتاب
- Neighborhood
- Location within Iran
- Country: Iran
- Province: Chaharmahal and Bakhtiari
- County: Lordegan
- District: Manj
- City: Manj-e Nesa

Population (2006)
  - Total: 495
- Time zone: UTC+3:30 (IRST)

Manj-e Baraftab (Persian: منج برافتاب) (Note: Also romanized as Manj-e Barāftāb, Monj-e Barāftāb and Monj-e Barr Āftāb) is a neighborhood in the city of Manj-e Nesa in Manj District of Lordegan County, Chaharmahal and Bakhtiari province.

== Demographics ==
=== Population ===
At the time of the 2006 National Census, Manj-e Baraftab's population was 495 in 96 households, when it was a village in Manj Rural District.

In 2011, the villages of Manj-e Baraftab, Manj-e Jahrub, and Manj-e Nesa merged to form the city of Manj-e Nesa.
