= Nadeh-ye Barmeyun =

Nadeh-ye Barmeyun نده برميون
- Village
- Location within Iran
- Coordinates: 31°02′52″N 50°45′52″E
- Country: Iran
- Province: Kohgiluyeh and Boyer-Ahmad
- County: Boyer-Ahmad
- Bakhsh: Ludab
- Rural District: Ludab

Population (2006)
  - Total: 27
- Time zone: UTC+3:30 (IRST)
  - Summer (DST): UTC+4:30 (IRDT)

Nadeh-ye Barmeyun (Persian: نده برميون, also Romanized as Nadeh-ye Barmeyūn; also known as Nadeh) is a village in Ludab Rural District, Ludab District, Boyer-Ahmad County, Kohgiluyeh and Boyer-Ahmad Province, Iran. At the 2006 census, its population was 27, in 6 families.
