= Shavar, Iran =

Shavar or Shovar (Persian: شوار) may refer to:

- Shovar, Chaharmahal and Bakhtiari
- Shavar, Khuzestan
