= Tuf Fazel Tahalyun =

Tuf Fazel Tahalyun طوف فاضل تهليون
- Village
- Country: Iran
- Province: Kohgiluyeh and Boyer-Ahmad
- County: Boyer-Ahmad
- Bakhsh: Ludab
- Rural District: Chin

Population (2006)
  - Total: 68
- Time zone: UTC+3:30 (IRST)
  - Summer (DST): UTC+4:30 (IRDT)

Tuf Fazel Tahalyun (Persian: طوف فاضل تهليون, also Romanized as Ţūf Fāz̤el Tahalyūn) is a village in Chin Rural District, Ludab District, Boyer-Ahmad County, Kohgiluyeh and Boyer-Ahmad Province, Iran. At the 2006 census, its population was 68, in 14 families.
