= Lir Sukhteh-ye Ludab =

Village in Kohgiluyeh and Boyer-Ahmad, Iran

Lir Sukhteh-ye Ludab ليرسوخته لوداب
- Village
- Location within Iran
- Coordinates: 30°59′48″N 50°50′59″E
- Country: Iran
- Province: Kohgiluyeh and Boyer-Ahmad
- County: Boyer-Ahmad
- Bakhsh: Ludab
- Rural District: Ludab

Population (2006)
  - Total: 45
- Time zone: UTC+3:30 (IRST)
  - Summer (DST): UTC+4:30 (IRDT)

Lir Sukhteh-ye Ludab (Persian: ليرسوخته لوداب, also Romanized as Līr Sūkhteh-ye Lūdāb; also known as Līr Sūkhteh) is a village in Ludab Rural District, Ludab District, Boyer-Ahmad County, Kohgiluyeh and Boyer-Ahmad Province, Iran. At the 2006 census, its population was 45, in 10 families.
