= Tang Bustan Zizi =

Tang Bustan Zizi تنگ بوستان زيزي
- Village
- Location within Iran
- Coordinates: 30°55′18″N 50°59′20″E
- Country: Iran
- Province: Kohgiluyeh and Boyer-Ahmad
- County: Boyer-Ahmad
- Bakhsh: Ludab
- Rural District: Ludab

Population (2006)
  - Total: 66
- Time zone: UTC+3:30 (IRST)
  - Summer (DST): UTC+4:30 (IRDT)

Tang Bustan Zizi (Persian: تنگ بوستان زيزي, also Romanized as Tang Būstān Zīzī; also known as Tang Būstān) is a village in Ludab Rural District, Ludab District, Boyer-Ahmad County, Kohgiluyeh and Boyer-Ahmad Province, Iran. As of the 2006 census, its population was 66, with 14 families.
