= Kabuneh =

Kabuneh كبونه
- Village
- Location within Iran
- Coordinates: 30°58′06″N 50°54′26″E
- Country: Iran
- Province: Kohgiluyeh and Boyer-Ahmad
- County: Boyer-Ahmad
- Bakhsh: Ludab
- Rural District: Ludab

Population (2006)
  - Total: 102
- Time zone: UTC+3:30 (IRST)
  - Summer (DST): UTC+4:30 (IRDT)

Kabuneh (Persian: كبونه, also Romanized as Kabūneh; also known as Kabūteh) is a village in Ludab Rural District, Ludab District, Boyer-Ahmad County, Kohgiluyeh and Boyer-Ahmad Province, Iran. At the 2006 census, its population was 102, in 18 families.
