= Ludab =

Ludab (Persian: لوداب) may refer to:

- Ludab District
- Ludab Rural District
