= Ab Lami-ye Guzenan =

Ab Lami ابلمي گوزنان
- Village
- Location within Iran
- Coordinates: 30°58′35″N 50°49′44″E
- Country: Iran
- Province: Kohgiluyeh and Boyer-Ahmad
- County: Boyer-Ahmad
- Bakhsh: Ludab
- Rural District: Ludab

Population (2006)
  - Total: 188
- Time zone: UTC+3:30 (IRST)
  - Summer (DST): UTC+4:30 (IRDT)

Ab Lami (Persian: ابلمي گوزنان, also Romanized as Āb Lamī-e Gūzenān; also known as Āb Lamī) is a village in Ludab Rural District, Ludab District, Boyer-Ahmad County, Kohgiluyeh and Boyer-Ahmad province, Iran. At the 2006 census, its population was 188, in 34 families.
