= Tall-e Siah-ye Ludab =

Tall-e Siah-ye Ludab تل سياه لوداب
- Village
- Country: Iran
- Province: Kohgiluyeh and Boyer-Ahmad
- County: Boyer-Ahmad
- Bakhsh: Ludab
- Rural District: Ludab

Population (2006)
  - Total: 137
- Time zone: UTC+3:30 (IRST)
  - Summer (DST): UTC+4:30 (IRDT)

Tall-e Siah-ye Ludab (Persian: تل سياه لوداب, also romanized as Tall-e Sīāh-ye Lūdāb) is a village in Ludab Rural District, Ludab District, Boyer-Ahmad County, Kohgiluyeh and Boyer-Ahmad province, Iran. At the 2006 census, its population was 137, in 27 families.
