= Gardan Tol =

Gardan Tol (Persian: گردن تل) may refer to:

- Gardan Tol, Fars
- Gardan Tol, Kohgiluyeh and Boyer-Ahmad
