= Darreh Deraz-e Chin =

Darreh Deraz-e Chin دره درازچين
- Village
- Location within Iran
- Coordinates: 31°00′01″N 50°55′48″E
- Country: Iran
- Province: Kohgiluyeh and Boyer-Ahmad
- County: Boyer-Ahmad
- Bakhsh: Ludab
- Rural District: Chin

Population (2006)
  - Total: 251
- Time zone: UTC+3:30 (IRST)
  - Summer (DST): UTC+4:30 (IRDT)

Darreh Deraz-e Chin (Persian: دره درازچين, also Romanized as Darreh Derāz-e Chīn; also known as Darreh Derāz) is a village in Chin Rural District, Ludab District, Boyer-Ahmad County, Kohgiluyeh and Boyer-Ahmad Province, Iran. At the 2006 census, its population was 251, in 49 families.
