= Kalmak-e Gelal =

Kalmak-e Gelal كلمك گلال
- Village
- Location within Iran
- Coordinates: 31°08′37″N 50°38′41″E
- Country: Iran
- Province: Kohgiluyeh and Boyer-Ahmad
- County: Boyer-Ahmad
- Bakhsh: Ludab
- Rural District: Chin

Population (2006)
  - Total: 28
- Time zone: UTC+3:30 (IRST)
  - Summer (DST): UTC+4:30 (IRDT)

Kalmak-e Gelal (Persian: كلمك گلال, also Romanized as Kalmak-e Gelāl or Kalmake Gelâl; also known as Kalmūk) is a village in Chin Rural District, Ludab District, Boyer-Ahmad County, Kohgiluyeh and Boyer-Ahmad Province, Iran. At the 2006 census, its population was 28, in 5 families.
