= Zirnaseh-ye Zizi =

Zirnaseh-ye Zizi زيرنسه زيزي
- Village
- Country: Iran
- Province: Kohgiluyeh and Boyer-Ahmad
- County: Boyer-Ahmad
- Bakhsh: Ludab
- Rural District: Ludab

Population (2006)
  - Total: 22
- Time zone: UTC+3:30 (IRST)
  - Summer (DST): UTC+4:30 (IRDT)

Zirnaseh-ye Zizi (Persian: زيرنسه زيزي, also Romanized as Zīrnaseh-ye Zīzī) is a village in Ludab Rural District, Ludab District, Boyer-Ahmad County, Kohgiluyeh and Boyer-Ahmad Province, Iran. At the 2006 census, its population was 22, in 5 families.
