= Cheshmeh Puti Leh Frakh =

Cheshmeh Puti Leh Frakh چشمه پوتي له فراخ
- Village
- Country: Iran
- Province: Kohgiluyeh and Boyer-Ahmad
- County: Boyer-Ahmad
- Bakhsh: Ludab
- Rural District: Chin

Population (2006)
  - Total: 41
- Time zone: UTC+3:30 (IRST)
  - Summer (DST): UTC+4:30 (IRDT)

Cheshmeh Puti Leh Frakh (Persian: چشمه پوتي له فراخ, also romanized as Cheshmeh Pūtī Leh Frākh) is a village in Chin Rural District, Ludab District, Boyer-Ahmad County, Kohgiluyeh and Boyer-Ahmad Province, Iran. As of the 2006 census, its population was 41, in 8 families.
