= Gavdaneh-ye Ludab =

Gavdaneh-ye Ludab گاودانه لوداب
- Village
- Location within Iran
- Coordinates: 30°58′02″N 50°37′04″E
- Country: Iran
- Province: Kohgiluyeh and Boyer-Ahmad
- County: Boyer-Ahmad
- Bakhsh: Ludab
- Rural District: Ludab

Population (2006)
  - Total: 65
- Time zone: UTC+3:30 (IRST)
  - Summer (DST): UTC+4:30 (IRDT)

Gavdaneh-ye Ludab (Persian: گاودانه لوداب, also Romanized as Gāvdāneh-ye Lūdāb; also known as Gāvdāneh) is a village in Ludab Rural District, Ludab District, Boyer-Ahmad County, Kohgiluyeh and Boyer-Ahmad Province, Iran. At the 2006 census, its population was 65, in 12 families.
