= Duraheh-ye Sofla Gelal =

Coordinates: 31.1320°N 50.6689°E

Duraheh-ye Sofla Gelal دوراهه سفلي گلال
- Village
- Country: Iran
- Province: Kohgiluyeh and Boyer-Ahmad
- County: Boyer-Ahmad
- Bakhsh: Ludab
- Rural District: Chin

Population (2006)
  - Total: 64
- Time zone: UTC+3:30 (IRST)
  - Summer (DST): UTC+4:30 (IRDT)

Duraheh-ye Sofla Gelal (Persian: دوراهه سفلي گلال, also Romanized as Dūrāheh-ye Soflá Gelāl) is a village in Chin Rural District, Ludab District, Boyer-Ahmad County, Kohgiluyeh and Boyer-Ahmad Province, Iran. At the 2006 census, its population was 64, in 13 families.
