= Zir-e Tut =

Zir-e Tut زيرتوت
- Village
- Location within Iran
- Coordinates: 31°06′04″N 50°46′54″E
- Country: Iran
- Province: Kohgiluyeh and Boyer-Ahmad
- County: Boyer-Ahmad
- Bakhsh: Ludab
- Rural District: Chin

Population (2006)
  - Total: 174
- Time zone: UTC+3:30 (IRST)
  - Summer (DST): UTC+4:30 (IRDT)

Zir-e Tut (Persian: زيرتوت, also Romanized as Zīr-e Tūt) is a village in Chin Rural District, Ludab District, Boyer-Ahmad County, Kohgiluyeh and Boyer-Ahmad Province, Iran. At the 2006 census, its population was 174, in 38 families.
