= Ab Chendaran =

Ab Chendaran (Persian: اب چنداران), also known as Ab Chendar-e Gelal, may refer to:

- Ab Chendaran-e Olya Gelal
- Ab Chendaran-e Sofla Gelal
- Ab Chendaran-e Tal Deraz
