= Gardan Partaraj Tang Pivareh =

Gardan Partaraj Tang Pivareh گردن پرتراج تنگ پيواره
- Village
- Location within Iran
- Coordinates: 31°01′07″N 50°44′05″E
- Country: Iran
- Province: Kohgiluyeh and Boyer-Ahmad
- County: Boyer-Ahmad
- Bakhsh: Ludab
- Rural District: Ludab

Population (2006)
  - Total: 26
- Time zone: UTC+3:30 (IRST)
  - Summer (DST): UTC+4:30 (IRDT)

Gardan Partaraj Tang Pivareh (Persian: گردن پرتراج تنگ پيواره, also Romanized as Gardan Partarāj Tang Pīvāreh; also known as Gardanpar-e Soltan) is a village in Ludab Rural District, Ludab District, Boyer-Ahmad County, Kohgiluyeh and Boyer-Ahmad Province, Iran. At the 2006 census, its population was 26, in 4 families.
