= Valihoseyn =

Valihoseyn ولي حسين
- Village
- Location within Iran
- Coordinates: 31°02′19″N 50°46′31″E
- Country: Iran
- Province: Kohgiluyeh and Boyer-Ahmad
- County: Boyer-Ahmad
- Bakhsh: Ludab
- Rural District: Chin

Population (2006)
  - Total: 402
- Time zone: UTC+3:30 (IRST)
  - Summer (DST): UTC+4:30 (IRDT)

Valihoseyn (Persian: ولي حسين, also Romanized as Valīḩoseyn) is a village in Chin Rural District, Ludab District, Boyer-Ahmad County, Kohgiluyeh and Boyer-Ahmad Province, Iran. At the 2006 census, its population was 402, in 72 families.
