= Dam Ab Bahareh-ye Chin =

Dam Ab Bahareh-ye Chin دم اب بهاره چين
- Village
- Country: Iran
- Province: Kohgiluyeh and Boyer-Ahmad
- County: Boyer-Ahmad
- Bakhsh: Ludab
- Rural District: Chin

Population (2006)
  - Total: 175
- Time zone: UTC+3:30 (IRST)
  - Summer (DST): UTC+4:30 (IRDT)

Dam Ab Bahareh-ye Chin (Persian: دم اب بهاره چين, also Romanized as Dam Āb Bahāreh-ye Chīn) is a village in Chin Rural District, Ludab District, Boyer-Ahmad County, Kohgiluyeh and Boyer-Ahmad Province, Iran. At the 2006 census, its population was 175, in 33 families.
