= Cheshmeh Jiuri Montangun =

Cheshmeh Jiuri Montangun چشمه جيوري منتنگون
- Village
- Location within Iran
- Coordinates: 30°53′47″N 51°01′15″E
- Country: Iran
- Province: Kohgiluyeh and Boyer-Ahmad
- County: Boyer-Ahmad
- Bakhsh: Ludab
- Rural District: Ludab

Population (2006)
  - Total: 165
- Time zone: UTC+3:30 (IRST)
  - Summer (DST): UTC+4:30 (IRDT)

Cheshmeh Jiuri Montangun (Persian: چشمه جيوري منتنگون, also Romanized as Cheshmeh Jīūrī Montangūn; also known as Cheshmeh Jeverl and Cheshmeh Jūrī) is a village in Ludab Rural District, Ludab District, Boyer-Ahmad County, Kohgiluyeh and Boyer-Ahmad Province, Iran. At the 2006 census, its population was 165, in 26 families.
