= Ab Bahareh-ye Chin =

Ab Bahareh-ye Chin اب بهاره چين
- Village
- Location within Iran
- Coordinates: 31°06′56″N 50°50′46″E
- Country: Iran
- Province: Kohgiluyeh and Boyer-Ahmad
- County: Boyer-Ahmad
- Bakhsh: Ludab
- Rural District: Chin

Population (2006)
  - Total: 134
- Time zone: UTC+3:30 (IRST)
  - Summer (DST): UTC+4:30 (IRDT)

Ab Bahareh-ye Chin (Persian: اب بهاره چين, also Romanized as Āb Bahāreh-ye Chīn; also known as Āb Bahāreh) is a village in Chin Rural District, Ludab District, Boyer-Ahmad County, Kohgiluyeh and Boyer-Ahmad province, Iran. At the 2006 census, its population was 134, in 21 families.
