= Lamab =

Lamab (Persian: لم اب) may refer to:

- Lamab-e Barmeyun
- Lamab-e Gol Espid
