= Puzeh Bali-ye Boland =

Puzeh Bali-ye Boland پوزه بلي بلند
- Village
- Location within Iran
- Coordinates: 31°03′56″N 50°52′54″E
- Country: Iran
- Province: Kohgiluyeh and Boyer-Ahmad
- County: Boyer-Ahmad
- Bakhsh: Ludab
- Rural District: Chin

Population (2006)
  - Total: 99
- Time zone: UTC+3:30 (IRST)
  - Summer (DST): UTC+4:30 (IRDT)

Puzeh Bali-ye Boland (Persian: پوزه بلي بلند, also Romanized as Pūzeh Balī-ye Boland; also known as Pūzeh Balūţ-e Boland) is a village in Chin Rural District, Ludab District, Boyer-Ahmad County, Kohgiluyeh and Boyer-Ahmad Province, Iran. At the 2006 census, its population was 99, in 23 families.
