= Pol Borideh =

Pol Borideh (Persian: پل بريده) may refer to:

- Pol Borideh, Chaharmahal and Bakhtiari
- Pol Borideh, Khuzestan
