= Zeyti =

Zeyti (Persian: زيتي) may refer to:

- Zeyti 2
- Zeyti 3
