= Darreh Nari-ye Dam Ludab =

Darreh Nari-ye Dam Ludab دره ناري دم لوداب
- Village
- Location within Iran
- Coordinates: 31°04′58″N 50°39′55″E
- Country: Iran
- Province: Kohgiluyeh and Boyer-Ahmad
- County: Boyer-Ahmad
- Bakhsh: Ludab
- Rural District: Ludab

Population (2006)
  - Total: 21
- Time zone: UTC+3:30 (IRST)
  - Summer (DST): UTC+4:30 (IRDT)

Darreh Nari-ye Dam Ludab (Persian: دره ناري دم لوداب, also Romanized as Darreh Nārī-ye Dam Lūdāb; also known as Darreh Nārī) is a village in Ludab Rural District, Ludab District, Boyer-Ahmad County, Kohgiluyeh and Boyer-Ahmad Province, Iran. At the 2006 census, its population was 21, in 4 families.
