= Cheshmeh Khani, Chaharmahal and Bakhtiari =

Village in Chaharmahal and Bakhtiari province, Iran

Cheshmeh Khani Persian: چشمه خاني
- Village
- Location within Iran
- Country: Iran
- Province: Chaharmahal and Bakhtiari
- County: Lordegan
- District: Manj
- Rural District: Barez

Population (2016)
  - Total: 411
- Time zone: UTC+3:30 (IRST)

Cheshmeh Khani (Persian: چشمه خاني) (Note: Also romanized as Cheshmeh Khānī) is a village in Barez Rural District of Manj District in Lordegan County, Chaharmahal and Bakhtiari province, Iran.

== Demographics ==
=== Population ===
At the time of the 2006 National Census, the village's population was 427 in 83 households. The following census in 2011 counted 428 people in 93 households. The 2016 census measured the population of the village as 411 people in 107 households.
