= Qaleh-ye Madraseh, Chaharmahal and Bakhtiari =

Village in Chaharmahal and Bakhtiari province, Iran

Qaleh-ye Madraseh Persian: ده نوبارز
- Village
- Location within Iran
- Coordinates: 31°29′12″N 50°33′16″E
- Country: Iran
- Province: Chaharmahal and Bakhtiari
- County: Lordegan
- District: Manj
- Rural District: Barez

Population (2016)
  - Total: 729
- Time zone: UTC+3:30 (IRST)

Qaleh-ye Madraseh (Persian: قلعه مدرسه) (Note: Also romanized as Qal‘eh-ye Madraseh) is a village in, and the capital of, Barez Rural District in Manj District of Lordegan County, Chaharmahal and Bakhtiari province, Iran.

== Demographics ==
=== Population ===
At the time of the 2006 National Census, the village's population was 677 in 126 households. The following census in 2011 counted 718 people in 180 households. The 2016 census measured the population of the village as 729 people in 186 households.
