= Chalderaz-e Gholamali =

Chalderaz-e Gholamali چال درازغلامعلي
- Village
- Location within Iran
- Coordinates: 31°30′25″N 50°30′28″E
- Country: Iran
- Province: Chaharmahal and Bakhtiari
- County: Lordegan
- Bakhsh: Manj
- Rural District: Barez

Population (2006)
  - Total: 115
- Time zone: UTC+3:30 (IRST)
  - Summer (DST): UTC+4:30 (IRDT)

Chalderaz-e Gholamali (Persian: چال درازغلامعلي, also Romanized as Chālderāz-e Gholāmʿalī) is a village in Barez Rural District, Manj District, Lordegan County, Chaharmahal and Bakhtiari Province, Iran. At the 2006 census, its population was 115, in 20 families.
