= Badamestan-e Mashhadiamir =

Badamestan-e Mashhadiamir بادامستان مشهدي امير
- Village
- Location within Iran
- Coordinates: 31°33′48″N 50°28′05″E
- Country: Iran
- Province: Chaharmahal and Bakhtiari
- County: Lordegan
- Bakhsh: Manj
- Rural District: Barez

Population (2006)
  - Total: 31
- Time zone: UTC+3:30 (IRST)
  - Summer (DST): UTC+4:30 (IRDT)

Badamestan-e Mashhadiamir (Persian: بادامستان مشهدي امير, also Romanized as Bādāmestān-e Mashhadīāmīr) is a village in Barez Rural District, Manj District, Lordegan County, Chaharmahal and Bakhtiari Province, Iran. At the 2006 census, its population was 31, in 5 families. The village is populated by Lurs.

== Geography ==
Badamestan-e Mashhadimir is located in the central part of western Iran, north of the capital city of Tehran.
