= Kamak-e Azizollah =

Kamak-e Azizollah كمك عزيزاله
- Village
- Location within Iran
- Coordinates: 31°01′23″N 50°47′58″E
- Country: Iran
- Province: Kohgiluyeh and Boyer-Ahmad
- County: Boyer-Ahmad
- Bakhsh: Ludab
- Rural District: Ludab

Population (2006)
  - Total: 47
- Time zone: UTC+3:30 (IRST)
  - Summer (DST): UTC+4:30 (IRDT)

Kamak-e Azizollah (Persian: كمك عزيزاله, also Romanized as Kamak-e ʿAzīzollah; also known as Kamak, Kamak-e ‘Olyā, and Kamak-e Vosţá) is a village in Ludab Rural District, Ludab District, Boyer-Ahmad County, Kohgiluyeh and Boyer-Ahmad Province, Iran. At the 2006 census, its population was 47, in 10 families.
