= Shovar, Chaharmahal and Bakhtiari =

Shovar شوار
- Village
- Location within Iran
- Coordinates: 31°32′05″N 50°22′19″E
- Country: Iran
- Province: Chaharmahal and Bakhtiari
- County: Lordegan
- Bakhsh: Manj
- Rural District: Barez

Population (2006)
  - Total: 330
- Time zone: UTC+3:30 (IRST)
  - Summer (DST): UTC+4:30 (IRDT)

Shovar (Persian: شوار, also Romanized as Shovār and Shavār; also known as Shovārz) is a village in Barez Rural District, Manj District, Lordegan County, Chaharmahal and Bakhtiari Province, Iran. At the 2006 census, its population was 330, in 69 families. The village is populated by Lurs.
