= Chigu =

Chigu may refer to:

- Chigu, Iran, a village in Chaharmahal and Bakhtiari Province, Iran
- Chigu District, Taiwan
- Chigu, Tibet, a village
