= Badamestan-e Aqajun =

Badamestan-e Aqajun بادامستان اقاجون
- Village
- Location within Iran
- Coordinates: 31°33′07″N 50°26′56″E
- Country: Iran
- Province: Chaharmahal and Bakhtiari
- County: Lordegan
- Bakhsh: Manj
- Rural District: Barez

Population (2006)
  - Total: 83
- Time zone: UTC+3:30 (IRST)
  - Summer (DST): UTC+4:30 (IRDT)

Badamestan-e Aqajun (Persian: بادامستان اقاجون, also Romanized as Bādāmestān-e Āqājūn; also known as Bādāmestān) is a village in Barez Rural District, Manj District, Lordegan County, Chaharmahal and Bakhtiari Province, Iran. At the 2006 census, its population was 83, in 15 families. The village is populated by Lurs.
