= Zeyti-ye Do =

Zeyti-ye Do زيتيدو
- Village
- Location within Iran
- Coordinates: 31°24′00″N 50°38′31″E
- Country: Iran
- Province: Chaharmahal and Bakhtiari
- County: Lordegan
- Bakhsh: Manj
- Rural District: Barez

Population (2006)
  - Total: 40
- Time zone: UTC+3:30 (IRST)
  - Summer (DST): UTC+4:30 (IRDT)

Zeyti-ye Do (Persian: زيتيدو, also Romanized as Zeytī-ye Do; also known as Zeytī) is a village in Barez Rural District, Manj District, Lordegan County, Chaharmahal and Bakhtiari Province, Iran. At the 2006 census, its population was 40, in 8 families.
