= Zafartehalayi =

Village in Kohgiluyeh and Boyer-Ahmad province, Iran

Zafartehalayi Persian: ظفرتهلايي
- Village
- Location within Iran
- Coordinates: 31°00′23″N 50°54′54″E
- Country: Iran
- Province: Kohgiluyeh and Boyer-Ahmad
- County: Boyer-Ahmad
- District: Ludab
- Rural District: Chin

Population (2016)
  - Total: 362
- Time zone: UTC+3:30 (IRST)

Zafartehalayi (Persian: ظفرتهلايي) (Note: Also romanized as Z̧afartehalāyī) is a village in, and the capital of, Chin Rural District of Ludab District, Boyer-Ahmad County, Kohgiluyeh and Boyer-Ahmad province, Iran.

== Demographics ==
=== Population ===
At the time of the 2006 National Census, the village's population was 462 in 93 households. The following census in 2011 counted 389 people in 82 households. The 2016 census measured the population of the village as 362 people in 93 households. It was the most populous village in its rural district.
