= Chalderaz-e Beytollah =

Chalderaz-e Beytollah چالدرازبيت اله
- Village
- Location within Iran
- Coordinates: 31°30′51″N 50°29′17″E
- Country: Iran
- Province: Chaharmahal and Bakhtiari
- County: Lordegan
- Bakhsh: Manj
- Rural District: Barez

Population (2006)
  - Total: 214
- Time zone: UTC+3:30 (IRST)
  - Summer (DST): UTC+4:30 (IRDT)

Chalderaz-e Beytollah (Persian: چالدرازبيت اله, also Romanized as Chālderāz-e Beytollah) is a village in Barez Rural District, Manj District, Lordegan County, Chaharmahal and Bakhtiari Province, Iran. At the 2006 census, its population was 214, in 43 families.
