= Ab Chenar-e Olya =

Ab Chenar-e Olya اب چنارعليا
- Village
- Location within Iran
- Coordinates: 31°27′27″N 50°35′32″E
- Country: Iran
- Province: Chaharmahal and Bakhtiari
- County: Lordegan
- Bakhsh: Manj
- Rural District: Barez

Population (2006)
  - Total: 179
- Time zone: UTC+3:30 (IRST)
  - Summer (DST): UTC+4:30 (IRDT)

Ab Chenar-e Olya (Persian: اب چنارعليا, also Romanized as Āb Chenār-e ‘Olyā; also known as Āb Chenār-e Zīlā’ī) is a village in Barez Rural District, Manj District, Lordegan County, Chaharmahal and Bakhtiari Province, Iran. At the 2006 census, its population was 179, in 28 families.
