= Chigu, Iran =

Chigu چيگو
- Village
- Location within Iran
- Coordinates: 31°34′55″N 50°41′49″E
- Country: Iran
- Province: Chaharmahal and Bakhtiari
- County: Lordegan
- Bakhsh: Manj
- Rural District: Manj

Population (2006)
  - Total: 657
- Time zone: UTC+3:30 (IRST)
  - Summer (DST): UTC+4:30 (IRDT)

Chigu (Persian: چيگو, also Romanized as Chīgū and Chigoo) is a village in Manj Rural District, Manj District, Lordegan County, Chaharmahal and Bakhtiari Province, Iran. At the 2006 census, its population was 657, in 115 families.
