= Delavari =

Delavari (Persian: دلاوری) may refer to:

- Delavari, Iran, a village in Kohgiluyeh and Boyer-Ahmad Province, Iran
- Jasem Delavari (1986–2025), Iranian boxer
