= Badamestan-e Amid Ali =

Badamestan-e Amid Ali بادامستان اميدعلي
- Village
- Location within Iran
- Coordinates: 31°33′36″N 50°25′12″E
- Country: Iran
- Province: Chaharmahal and Bakhtiari
- County: Lordegan
- Bakhsh: Manj
- Rural District: Barez

Population (2006)
  - Total: 29
- Time zone: UTC+3:30 (IRST)
  - Summer (DST): UTC+4:30 (IRDT)

Badamestan-e Amid Ali (Persian: بادامستان اميدعلي, also Romanized as Bādāmestān-e Amīd ʿAlī; also known as Bādāmestān) is a village in Barez Rural District, Manj District, Lordegan County, Chaharmahal and Bakhtiari Province, Iran. At the 2006 census, its population was 29, in 6 families. The village is populated by Lurs.
