= Chalderaz-e Esfandiyar =

Chalderaz-e Esfandiyar چال درازاسفنديار
- Village
- Location within Iran
- Coordinates: 31°30′13″N 50°31′07″E
- Country: Iran
- Province: Chaharmahal and Bakhtiari
- County: Lordegan
- Bakhsh: Manj
- Rural District: Barez

Population (2006)
  - Total: 86
- Time zone: UTC+3:30 (IRST)
  - Summer (DST): UTC+4:30 (IRDT)

Chalderaz-e Esfandiyar (Persian: چال درازاسفنديار, also Romanized as Chālderāz-e Esfandīyār) is a village in Barez Rural District, Manj District, Lordegan County, Chaharmahal and Bakhtiari Province, Iran. At the 2006 census, its population was 86, in 15 families.
