= Ab Chenaru =

Ab Chenaru (Persian: اب چنارو) may refer to:

- Ab Chenaru, Fars
- Ab Chenaru, Kohgiluyeh and Boyer-Ahmad
