= Bideleh =

Village in Chaharmahal and Bakhtiari province, Iran

Bideleh Persian: بيدله
- Village
- Location within Iran
- Coordinates: 31°34′54″N 50°32′18″E
- Country: Iran
- Province: Chaharmahal and Bakhtiari
- County: Lordegan
- District: Manj
- Rural District: Manj

Population (2016)
  - Total: 1,807
- Time zone: UTC+3:30 (IRST)

Bideleh (Persian: بيدله) (Note: Also romanized as Bīdeleh; also known as Bīdala) is a village in Manj Rural District of Manj District in Lordegan County, Chaharmahal and Bakhtiari province, Iran.

== Demographics ==
=== Ethnicity ===
The village is populated by Lurs.

=== Population ===
At the time of the 2006 National Census, the village's population was 1,721 in 368 households. The following census in 2011 counted 1,849 people in 457 households. The 2016 census measured the population of the village as 1,807 people in 480 households. It was the most populous village in its rural district.
