= Silarestan-e Sofla Dam Ludab =

Silarestan-e Sofla Dam Ludab سي لارستان سفلي دم لوداب
- Village
- Location within Iran
- Coordinates: 30°56′15″N 50°43′06″E
- Country: Iran
- Province: Kohgiluyeh and Boyer-Ahmad
- County: Boyer-Ahmad
- Bakhsh: Ludab
- Rural District: Ludab

Population (2006)
  - Total: 40
- Time zone: UTC+3:30 (IRST)
  - Summer (DST): UTC+4:30 (IRDT)

Silarestan-e Sofla Dam Ludab (Persian: سي لارستان سفلي دم لوداب, also Romanized as Sīlārestān-e Soflá Dam Lūdāb; also known as Sīlārestān and Sīlārestān-e Soflá) is a village in Ludab Rural District, Ludab District, Boyer-Ahmad County, Kohgiluyeh and Boyer-Ahmad Province, Iran. At the 2006 census, its population was 40, in 10 families.
