= Ab Chendaran-e Sofla Gelal =

Ab Chendaran-e Sofla Gelal اب چنداران سفلي گلال
- Village
- Location within Iran
- Coordinates: 31°04′09″N 50°47′08″E
- Country: Iran
- Province: Kohgiluyeh and Boyer-Ahmad
- County: Boyer-Ahmad
- Bakhsh: Ludab
- Rural District: Chin

Population (2006)
  - Total: 444
- Time zone: UTC+3:30 (IRST)
  - Summer (DST): UTC+4:30 (IRDT)

Ab Chendaran-e Sofla Gelal (Persian: اب چنداران سفلي گلال, also Romanized as Āb Chendārān-e Soflá Gelāl; also known as Āb Chendār, Āb Chendārān, and Āb Chendār-e Gelāl) is a village in Chin Rural District, Ludab District, Boyer-Ahmad County, Kohgiluyeh and Boyer-Ahmad Province, Iran. At the 2006 census, its population was 444, in 85 families.
