= Shahrak-e Mashk Duzan =

Village in Chaharmahal and Bakhtiari province, Iran

Shahrak-e Mashk Duzan Persian: شهرك مشك دوزان
- Village
- Location within Iran
- Coordinates: 31°32′39″N 50°37′05″E
- Country: Iran
- Province: Chaharmahal and Bakhtiari
- County: Lordegan
- District: Manj
- Rural District: Manj

Population (2016)
  - Total: 753
- Time zone: UTC+3:30 (IRST)

Shahrak-e Mashk Duzan (Persian: شهرك مشك دوزان) (Note: Also romanized as Shahrak-e Mashk Dūzān) is a village in Manj Rural District of Manj District in Lordegan County, Chaharmahal and Bakhtiari province, Iran.

== Demographics ==
=== Ethnicity ===
The village is populated by Lurs.

=== Population ===
At the time of the 2006 National Census, the village's population was 354 in 68 households. The following census in 2011 counted 603 people in 131 households. The 2016 census measured the population of the village as 753 people in 185 households.
