= Varkohleh =

Village in Chaharmahal and Bakhtiari province, Iran

Varkohleh Persian: وركهله
- Village
- Location within Iran
- Country: Iran
- Province: Chaharmahal and Bakhtiari
- County: Lordegan
- District: Manj
- Rural District: Manj

Population (2016)
  - Total: 523
- Time zone: UTC+3:30 (IRST)

Varkohleh (Persian: وركهله) (Note: Also romanized as Varkohleh; also known as Varkohleh-ye Sarqaleh) is a village in Manj Rural District of Manj District in Lordegan County, Chaharmahal and Bakhtiari province, Iran.

== Demographics ==
=== Ethnicity ===
The village is populated by Lurs.

=== Population ===
At the time of the 2006 National Census, the village's population was 491 in 89 households. The following census in 2011 counted 496 people in 97 households. The 2016 census measured the population of the village as 523 people in 135 households.
