= Gardan Tol-e Barmeyun =

Gardan Tol-e Barmeyun گردن تل برميون
- Village
- Location within Iran
- Coordinates: 31°05′28″N 50°40′34″E
- Country: Iran
- Province: Kohgiluyeh and Boyer-Ahmad
- County: Boyer-Ahmad
- Bakhsh: Ludab
- Rural District: Ludab

Population (2006)
  - Total: 100
- Time zone: UTC+3:30 (IRST)
  - Summer (DST): UTC+4:30 (IRDT)

Gardan Tol-e Barmeyun (Persian: گردن تل برميون, also Romanized as Gardan Tol-e Barmeyūn; also known as Gardan Tol and Gardan Tūl) is a village in Ludab Rural District, Ludab District, Boyer-Ahmad County, Kohgiluyeh and Boyer-Ahmad Province, Iran. At the 2006 census, its population was 100, in 20 families.
