= Deh Sukhteh-ye Dam Ludab =

Village in Kohgiluyeh and Boyer-Ahmad, Iran

Deh Sukhteh-ye Dam Ludab ده سوخته دم لوداب
- Village
- Location within Iran
- Coordinates: 31°01′56″N 50°44′51″E
- Country: Iran
- Province: Kohgiluyeh and Boyer-Ahmad
- County: Boyer-Ahmad
- Bakhsh: Ludab
- Rural District: Ludab

Population (2006)
  - Total: 244
- Time zone: UTC+3:30 (IRST)
  - Summer (DST): UTC+4:30 (IRDT)

Deh Sukhteh-ye Dam Ludab (Persian: ده سوخته دم لوداب, also romanized as Deh Sūkhteh-ye Dam Lūdāb; also known as Deh Sūkhteh) is a village in Ludab Rural District, Ludab District, Boyer-Ahmad County, Kohgiluyeh and Boyer-Ahmad Province, Iran. At the 2006 census, its population was 244, in 54 families.
