= Sargar Dangah =

Sargar Dangah سرگردنگاه
- Village
- Location within Iran
- Coordinates: 31°10′06″N 50°34′01″E
- Country: Iran
- Province: Kohgiluyeh and Boyer-Ahmad
- County: Boyer-Ahmad
- Bakhsh: Ludab
- Rural District: Ludab

Population (2006)
  - Total: 42
- Time zone: UTC+3:30 (IRST)
  - Summer (DST): UTC+4:30 (IRDT)

Sargar Dangah (Persian: سرگردنگاه, also Romanized as Sargar Dangāh; also known as Sargar Va Zīrgar) is a village in Ludab Rural District, Ludab District, Boyer-Ahmad County, Kohgiluyeh and Boyer-Ahmad Province, Iran. At the 2006 census, its population was 42, in 10 families.
