= Ab Bidak, Chaharmahal and Bakhtiari =

Village in Chaharmahal and Bakhtiari province, Iran

Ab Bidak Persian: اب بيدك
- Village
- Location within Iran
- Coordinates: 31°33′24″N 50°36′35″E
- Country: Iran
- Province: Chaharmahal and Bakhtiari
- County: Lordegan
- District: Manj
- Rural District: Manj

Population (2016)
  - Total: 550
- Time zone: UTC+3:30 (IRST)

Ab Bidak (Persian: اب بيدك) (Note: Also romanized as Āb Bīdak) is a village in Manj Rural District of Manj District in Lordegan County, Chaharmahal and Bakhtiari province, Iran.

== Demographics ==
=== Ethnicity ===
The village is populated by Lurs.

=== Population ===
At the time of the 2006 National Census, the village's population was 491 in 93 households. The following census in 2011 counted 545 people in 116 households. The 2016 census measured the population of the village as 550 people in 149 households.
