= Kamak-e Khodadad =

Kamak-e Khodadad كمك خداداد
- Village
- Location within Iran
- Coordinates: 31°01′12″N 50°48′27″E
- Country: Iran
- Province: Kohgiluyeh and Boyer-Ahmad
- County: Boyer-Ahmad
- Bakhsh: Ludab
- Rural District: Ludab

Population (2006)
  - Total: 86
- Time zone: UTC+3:30 (IRST)
  - Summer (DST): UTC+4:30 (IRDT)

Kamak-e Khodadad (Persian: كمك خداداد, also Romanized as Kamak-e Khodādād; also known as Chamech, Chamesh, Kamak, Kamak-e Soflá, and Kamek) is a village in Ludab Rural District, Ludab District, Boyer-Ahmad County, Kohgiluyeh and Boyer-Ahmad Province, Iran. At the 2006 census, its population was 86, in 17 families.
