= Nasirabad, Lordegan =

Village in Chaharmahal and Bakhtiari province, Iran

Nasirabad Persian: نصيراباد
- Village
- Location within Iran
- Coordinates: 31°30′52″N 50°24′33″E
- Country: Iran
- Province: Chaharmahal and Bakhtiari
- County: Lordegan
- District: Manj
- Rural District: Barez

Population (2016)
  - Total: 413
- Time zone: UTC+3:30 (IRST)

Nasirabad (Persian: نصيراباد) (Note: Also romanized as Naṣīrābād) is a village in Barez Rural District of Manj District in Lordegan County, Chaharmahal and Bakhtiari province, Iran.

== Demographics ==
=== Population ===
At the time of the 2006 National Census, the village's population was 370 in 66 households. The following census in 2011 counted 384 people in 77 households. The 2016 census measured the population of the village as 413 people in 100 households.
