= Gowd Sar =

Village in Chaharmahal and Bakhtiari province, Iran

Gowd Sar Persian: گودسر
- Village
- Location within Iran
- Coordinates: 31°27′37″N 50°27′47″E
- Country: Iran
- Province: Chaharmahal and Bakhtiari
- County: Lordegan
- District: Manj
- Rural District: Barez

Population (2016)
  - Total: 463
- Time zone: UTC+3:30 (IRST)

Gowd Sar (Persian: گودسر) (Note: Also known as Gowdī Sar) is a village in Barez Rural District of Manj District in Lordegan County, Chaharmahal and Bakhtiari province, Iran.

== Demographics ==
=== Population ===
At the time of the 2006 National Census, the village's population was 608 in 108 households. The following census in 2011 counted 655 people in 129 households. The 2016 census measured the population of the village as 463 people in 120 households.
