= Ab Chendar-e Guzenan =

Ab Chendar-e Guzenan اب چندارگوزنان
- Village
- Location within Iran
- Coordinates: 31°03′55″N 50°48′11″E
- Country: Iran
- Province: Kohgiluyeh and Boyer-Ahmad
- County: Boyer-Ahmad
- Bakhsh: Ludab
- Rural District: Ludab

Population (2006)
  - Total: 91
- Time zone: UTC+3:30 (IRST)
  - Summer (DST): UTC+4:30 (IRDT)

Ab Chendar-e Guzenan (Persian: اب چندارگوزنان, also Romanized as Āb Chendār-e Gūzenān; also known as Āb Chendār) is a village in Ludab Rural District, Ludab District, Boyer-Ahmad County, Kohgiluyeh and Boyer-Ahmad Province, Iran. At the 2006 census, its population was 91 within 18 families.
