= Deh-e Sukhteh, Manj =

Deh-e Sukhteh ده سوخته
- Village
- Location within Iran
- Coordinates: 31°30′43″N 50°39′37″E
- Country: Iran
- Province: Chaharmahal and Bakhtiari
- County: Lordegan
- Bakhsh: Manj
- Rural District: Manj

Population (2006)
  - Total: 282
- Time zone: UTC+3:30 (IRST)
  - Summer (DST): UTC+4:30 (IRDT)

Deh-e Sukhteh (Persian: ده سوخته, also Romanized as Deh-e Sūkhteh; also known as Deh-e Sūkhteh Monj) is a village in Manj Rural District, Manj District, Lordegan County, Chaharmahal and Bakhtiari Province, Iran. At the 2006 census, its population was 282, in 56 families. The village is populated by Lurs.
