= Sargar-e Sasargun =

Sargar-e Sasargun سرگرساسرگون
- Village
- Location within Iran
- Coordinates: 30°57′50″N 50°53′16″E
- Country: Iran
- Province: Kohgiluyeh and Boyer-Ahmad
- County: Boyer-Ahmad
- Bakhsh: Ludab
- Rural District: Ludab

Population (2006)
  - Total: 29
- Time zone: UTC+3:30 (IRST)
  - Summer (DST): UTC+4:30 (IRDT)

Sargar-e Sasargun (Persian: سرگرساسرگون, also Romanized as Sargar-e Sāsargūn; also known as Sargar) is a village in Ludab Rural District, Ludab District, Boyer-Ahmad County, Kohgiluyeh and Boyer-Ahmad Province, Iran. At the 2006 census, its population was 29, in 7 families.
