= Ab Chendaran-e Tal Deraz =

Ab Chendaran-e Tal Deraz اب چنداران تل دراز
- Village
- Location within Iran
- Coordinates: 31°11′51″N 50°29′51″E
- Country: Iran
- Province: Kohgiluyeh and Boyer-Ahmad
- County: Boyer-Ahmad
- Bakhsh: Ludab
- Rural District: Ludab

Population (2006)
  - Total: 214
- Time zone: UTC+3:30 (IRST)
  - Summer (DST): UTC+4:30 (IRDT)

Ab Chendaran-e Tal Deraz (Persian: اب چنداران تل دراز, also Romanized as Āb Chendārān-e Tal Derāz; also known as Āb Chendār) is a village in Ludab Rural District, Ludab District, Boyer-Ahmad County, Kohgiluyeh and Boyer-Ahmad Province, Iran. At the 2006 census, its population was 214, in 36 families.
