= Ab Murd-e Tangiar =

Ab Murd-e Tanglar ابموردتنگيار
- Village
- Location within Iran
- Coordinates: 31°00′17″N 50°47′23″E
- Country: Iran
- Province: Kohgiluyeh and Boyer-Ahmad
- County: Boyer-Ahmad
- Bakhsh: Ludab
- Rural District: Ludab

Population (2006)
  - Total: 32
- Time zone: UTC+3:30 (IRST)
  - Summer (DST): UTC+4:30 (IRDT)

Ab Murd-e Tanglar (Persian: ابموردتنگيار, also Romanized as Āb Mūrd-e Tanglār; also known as Āb Mowrd and Āb Mūrd) is a village in Ludab Rural District, Ludab District, Boyer-Ahmad County, Kohgiluyeh and Boyer-Ahmad province, Iran. At the 2006 census, its population was 32, in 6 families.
