= Silarestan-e Olya Dam Ludab =

Silarestan-e Olya Dam Ludab سي لارستان عليادم لوداب
- Village
- Location within Iran
- Coordinates: 30°56′26″N 50°44′09″E
- Country: Iran
- Province: Kohgiluyeh and Boyer-Ahmad
- County: Boyer-Ahmad
- Bakhsh: Ludab
- Rural District: Ludab

Population (2006)
  - Total: 63
- Time zone: UTC+3:30 (IRST)
  - Summer (DST): UTC+4:30 (IRDT)

Silarestan-e Olya Dam Ludab (Persian: سي لارستان عليادم لوداب, also Romanized as Sīlārestān-e ‘Olyā Dam Lūdāb; also known as Sīlārestān, Sīlārestān-e Bālā, and Sīlārestān-e ‘Olyā) is a village in Ludab Rural District, Ludab District, Boyer-Ahmad County, Kohgiluyeh and Boyer-Ahmad Province, Iran. At the 2006 census, its population was 63, in 10 families.
