= Delavari-ye Gorgian =

Village in Kohgiluyeh and Boyer-Ahmad, Iran

Delavari-ye Gorgian دلاوري گرگيان
- Village
- Location within Iran
- Coordinates: 30°59′26″N 50°51′31″E
- Country: Iran
- Province: Kohgiluyeh and Boyer-Ahmad
- County: Boyer-Ahmad
- Bakhsh: Ludab
- Rural District: Ludab

Population (2006)
  - Total: 33
- Time zone: UTC+3:30 (IRST)
  - Summer (DST): UTC+4:30 (IRDT)

Delavari-ye Gorgian (Persian: دلاوري گرگيان, also Romanized as Delāvarī-ye Gorgīān; also known as Delāvarī) is a village in Ludab Rural District, Ludab District, Boyer-Ahmad County, Kohgiluyeh and Boyer-Ahmad Province, Iran.

At the 2006 census, its population was 33, in 6 families.
