= Lamab-e Barmeyun =

Lamab-e Barmeyun لم اب برميون
- Village
- Location within Iran
- Coordinates: 31°04′57″N 50°47′05″E
- Country: Iran
- Province: Kohgiluyeh and Boyer-Ahmad
- County: Boyer-Ahmad
- Bakhsh: Ludab
- Rural District: Ludab

Population (2006)
  - Total: 14
- Time zone: UTC+3:30 (IRST)
  - Summer (DST): UTC+4:30 (IRDT)

Lamab-e Barmeyun (Persian: لم اب برميون, also Romanized as Lamāb-e Barmeyūn; also known as Lamāb) is a village in Ludab Rural District, Ludab District, Boyer-Ahmad County, Kohgiluyeh and Boyer-Ahmad Province, Iran. At the 2006 census, its population was 14, in 4 families.
