= Garab-e Sofla =

City in Kohgiluyeh and Boyer-Ahmad province, Iran

Garab-e Sofla Persian: گراب سفلي
- City
- Location within Iran
- Coordinates: 30°56′34″N 50°53′56″E
- Country: Iran
- Province: Kohgiluyeh and Boyer-Ahmad
- County: Boyer-Ahmad
- District: Ludab

Population (2016)
  - Total: 545
- Time zone: UTC+3:30 (IRST)

Garab-e Sofla (Persian: گراب سفلي) (Note: Also romanized as Garāb-e Sofla; also known as Garab-e-Pain (گراب پائين), also romanized as Garāb-e Pā’īn) is a city in, and the capital of, Ludab District of Boyer-Ahmad County, Kohgiluyeh and Boyer-Ahmad province, Iran. It also serves as the administrative center for Ludab Rural District.

== Demographics ==
=== Population ===
At the time of the 2006 National Census, the city's population was 416 in 84 households. The following census in 2011 counted 492 people in 100 households. The 2016 census measured the population of the city as 545 people in 125 households.
