= Deh Now-ye Barez =

Village in Chaharmahal and Bakhtiari province, Iran

Deh Now-ye Barez Persian: ده نوبارز
- Village
- Location within Iran
- Coordinates: 31°31′12″N 50°23′54″E
- Country: Iran
- Province: Chaharmahal and Bakhtiari
- County: Lordegan
- District: Manj
- Rural District: Barez

Population (2016)
  - Total: 1,171
- Time zone: UTC+3:30 (IRST)

Deh Now-ye Barez (Persian: ده نوبارز) (Note: Also romanized as Deh Now-ye Bārez) is a village in Barez Rural District of Manj District in Lordegan County, Chaharmahal and Bakhtiari province, Iran.

== Demographics ==
=== Population ===
At the time of the 2006 National Census, the village's population was 931 in 176 households. The following census in 2011 counted 1,146 people in 227 households. The 2016 census measured the population of the village as 1,171 people in 271 households. It was the most populous village in its rural district.
