= Pol Borideh, Chaharmahal and Bakhtiari =

Village in Chaharmahal and Bakhtiari province, Iran

Pol Borideh Persian: پل بريده
- Village
- Location within Iran
- Coordinates: 31°32′48″N 50°40′00″E
- Country: Iran
- Province: Chaharmahal and Bakhtiari
- County: Lordegan
- District: Manj
- Rural District: Manj

Population (2016)
  - Total: 1,112
- Time zone: UTC+3:30 (IRST)

Pol Borideh (Persian: پل بريده) (Note: Also romanized as Pol Borīdeh; also known as Pol Borīdeh Pā’īn, Pol Borīdeh-e Pā’īn, and Pol Borīdeh-ye Soflá) is a village in Manj Rural District of Manj District in Lordegan County, Chaharmahal and Bakhtiari province, Iran.

== Demographics ==
=== Ethnicity ===
The village is populated by Lurs.

=== Population ===
At the time of the 2006 National Census, the village's population was 904 in 171 households. The following census in 2011 counted 1,025 people in 227 households. The 2016 census measured the population of the village as 1,112 people in 304 households.
