= Ab Murd-e Dam Ludab =

Village in Kohgiluyeh and Boyer-Ahmad province, Iran

Ab Murd-e Dam Ludab Persian: اب مورددم لوداب
- Village
- Location within Iran
- Coordinates: 31°00′15″N 50°47′21″E
- Country: Iran
- Province: Kohgiluyeh and Boyer-Ahmad
- County: Boyer-Ahmad
- District: Ludab
- Rural District: Ludab

Population (2016)
  - Total: 572
- Time zone: UTC+3:30 (IRST)

Ab Murd-e Dam Ludab (Persian: اب مورددم لوداب) (Note: Also romanized as Āb Mūrd-e Dam Lūdāb; also known as Ab Moord and Āb Mūrd) is a village in Ludab Rural District of Ludab District, Boyer-Ahmad County, Kohgiluyeh and Boyer-Ahmad province, Iran.

== Demographics ==
=== Population ===
At the time of the 2006 National Census, the village's population was 663 in 122 households. The following census in 2011 counted 620 people in 131 households. The 2016 census measured the population of the village as 572 people in 139 households. It was the most populous village in its rural district.
