= Manj-e Nesa =

City in Chaharmahal and Bakhtiari province, Iran

Manj-e Nesa Persian: منج نسا
- City
- Location within Iran
- Coordinates: 31°32′15″N 50°37′38″E
- Country: Iran
- Province: Chaharmahal and Bakhtiari
- County: Lordegan
- District: Manj
- Established as a city: 2011

Population (2016)
  - Total: 1,492
- Time zone: UTC+3:30 (IRST)

Manj-e Nesa (Persian: منج نسا) (Note: Also romanized as Manj-e Nesā’ and Monj-e Nesā’; also known as Manj, Monj, Monj Bālā, and Monj-e Bālā) is a city in, and the capital of, Manj District in Lordegan County, Chaharmahal and Bakhtiari province, Iran. It also serves as the administrative center for Manj Rural District.

== Demographics ==
=== Ethnicity ===
The city is populated by Lurs.

=== Population ===
At the time of the 2006 National Census, the population was 661 in 139 households, when it was a village in Manj Rural District. The following census in 2011 counted 1,486 people in 338 households. The 2016 census measured the population as 1,492 people in 381 households, by which time the village had merged with the villages of Manj-e Baraftab and Manj-e Jahrub in forming the city of Manj-e Nesa.
