= Ab Chenar-e Sofla =

Village in Chaharmahal and Bakhtiari province, Iran

Ab Chenar-e Sofla Persian: اب چنارسفلي
- Village
- Location within Iran
- Coordinates: 31°27′23″N 50°35′33″E
- Country: Iran
- Province: Chaharmahal and Bakhtiari
- County: Lordegan
- District: Manj
- Rural District: Barez

Population (2016)
  - Total: 647
- Time zone: UTC+3:30 (IRST)

Ab Chenar-e Sofla (Persian: اب چنارسفلي) (Note: Also romanized as Āb Chenār-e Soflá) is a village in Barez Rural District of Manj District in Lordegan County, Chaharmahal and Bakhtiari province, Iran.

== Demographics ==
=== Population ===
At the time of the 2006 National Census, the village's population was 814 in 133 households. The following census in 2011 counted 891 people in 190 households. The 2016 census measured the population of the village as 647 people in 164 households.
