= Kamak-e Olya =

Kamak-e Olya كمك عليا
- Village
- Location within Iran
- Coordinates: 34°54′01″N 47°56′55″E
- Country: Iran
- Province: Kurdistan
- County: Qorveh
- Bakhsh: Chaharduli
- Rural District: Chaharduli-ye Gharbi

Population (2006)
  - Total: 355
- Time zone: UTC+3:30 (IRST)
  - Summer (DST): UTC+4:30 (IRDT)

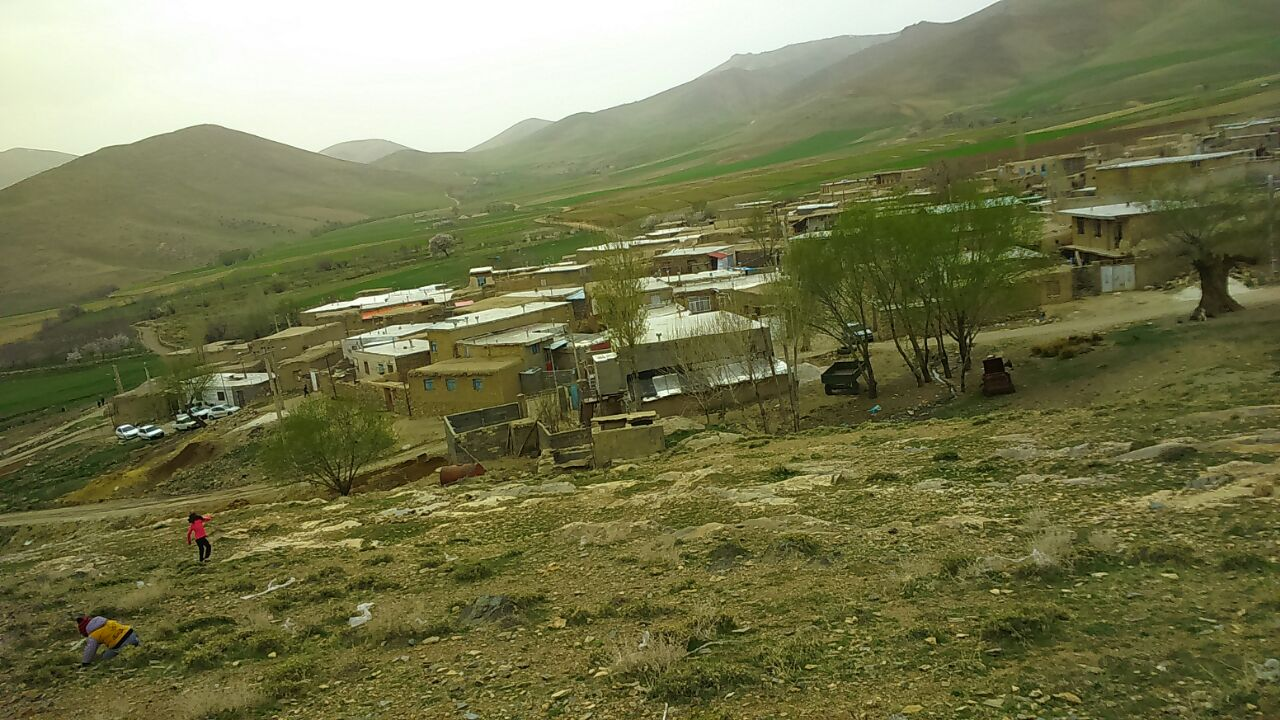
Kamak Aliya Village

Kamak-e Olya (Persian: كمك عليا, also Romanized as Kamak-e ‘Olyā and Kamak ‘Olyā; also known as Kamak, Kamak-e Bālā, and Kūmak Bāla) is a village in Chaharduli-ye Gharbi Rural District, Chaharduli District, Qorveh County, Kurdistan Province, Iran. At the 2006 census, its population was 685, in 135 families. The village is populated by Kurds.
