= Badamestan, Kohgiluyeh and Boyer-Ahmad =

Badamestan بادامستان
- Village
- Location within Iran
- Coordinates: 30°58′45″N 50°19′42″E
- Country: Iran
- Province: Kohgiluyeh and Boyer-Ahmad
- County: Landeh
- Bakhsh: Central
- Rural District: Olya Tayeb

Population (2006)
  - Total: 43
- Time zone: UTC+3:30 (IRST)
  - Summer (DST): UTC+4:30 (IRDT)

Badamestan (Persian: بادامستان, also Romanized as Bādāmestān; also known as Bādāmestān-e Pā’īn) is a village in Olya Tayeb Rural District, in the Central District of Landeh County, Kohgiluyeh and Boyer-Ahmad Province, Iran. At the 2006 census, its population was 43, in 6 families.
