= Badamestan-e Bala =

Badamestan-e Bala بادامستان بالا
- Village
- Location within Iran
- Coordinates: 30°20′01″N 55°11′44″E
- Country: Iran
- Province: Kerman
- County: Shahr-e Babak
- Bakhsh: Central
- Rural District: Madvarat

Population (2006)
  - Total: 119
- Time zone: UTC+3:30 (IRST)
  - Summer (DST): UTC+4:30 (IRDT)

Badamestan-e Bala (Persian: بادامستان بالا, also Romanized as Bādāmestān-e Bālā; also known as Bādāmestān) is a village in Madvarat Rural District, in the Central District of Shahr-e Babak County, Kerman Province, Iran. At the 2006 census, its population was 119, in 33 families.
