= Ab Chenar-e Bid Anjir =

Ab Chenar-e Bid Anjir اب چناربيدانجير
- Village
- Country: Iran
- Province: Kohgiluyeh and Boyer-Ahmad
- County: Charam
- Bakhsh: Sarfaryab
- Rural District: Poshteh-ye Zilayi

Population (2006)
  - Total: 50
- Time zone: UTC+3:30 (IRST)
  - Summer (DST): UTC+4:30 (IRDT)

Ab Chenar-e Bid Anjir (Persian: اب چناربيدانجير, also Romanized as Āb Chenār-e Bīd Ānjīr) is a village in Poshteh-ye Zilayi Rural District, Sarfaryab District, Charam County, Kohgiluyeh and Boyer-Ahmad Province, Iran. At the 2006 census, its population was 50, in 13 families.
