= Badamestan-e Farvivand =

Badamestan-e Farvivand بادامستان فرويوند
- Village
- Location within Iran
- Coordinates: 32°56′00″N 48°17′00″E
- Country: Iran
- Province: Khuzestan
- County: Andimeshk
- Bakhsh: Alvar-e Garmsiri
- Rural District: Qilab

Population (2006)
  - Total: 46
- Time zone: UTC+3:30 (IRST)
  - Summer (DST): UTC+4:30 (IRDT)

Badamestan-e Farvivand (Persian: بادامستان فرويوند, also Romanized as Bādāmestān-e Farvīvand; also known as Bādāmestān-e Fardīvand) is a village in Qilab Rural District, Alvar-e Garmsiri District, Andimeshk County, Khuzestan Province, Iran. At the 2006 census, its population was 46, in 9 families.
