= Silarestan =

Silarestan سيلارستان
- Village
- Location within Iran
- Coordinates: 30°56′15″N 50°43′06″E
- Country: Iran
- Province: Kohgiluyeh and Boyer-Ahmad
- County: Charam
- Bakhsh: Sarfaryab
- Rural District: Poshteh-ye Zilayi

Population (2006)
  - Total: 65
- Time zone: UTC+3:30 (IRST)
  - Summer (DST): UTC+4:30 (IRDT)

Silarestan (Persian: سيلارستان, also Romanized as Sīlārestān; also known as Sīlārestān-e Soflá) is a village in Poshteh-ye Zilayi Rural District, Sarfaryab District, Charam County, Kohgiluyeh and Boyer-Ahmad Province, Iran. At the 2006 census, its population was 65, in 12 families.
