= Ab Chenar, Khuzestan =

Ab Chenar اب چنار
- Village
- Location within Iran
- Coordinates: 31°54′14″N 49°59′58″E
- Country: Iran
- Province: Khuzestan
- County: Izeh
- Bakhsh: Central
- Rural District: Howmeh-ye Sharqi

Population (2006)
  - Total: 59
- Time zone: UTC+3:30 (IRST)
  - Summer (DST): UTC+4:30 (IRDT)

Ab Chenar (Persian: اب چنار, also Romanized as Āb Chenār; also known as Ābchenār) is a village in Howmeh-ye Sharqi Rural District, in the Central District of Izeh County, Khuzestan Province, Iran. At the 2006 census, its population was 59, in 8 families.
