= Pol Borideh, Khuzestan =

Pol Borideh پل بريده
- Village
- Location within Iran
- Coordinates: 31°31′46″N 49°47′13″E
- Country: Iran
- Province: Khuzestan
- County: Bagh-e Malek
- Bakhsh: Central
- Rural District: Rud Zard

Population (2006)
  - Total: 80
- Time zone: UTC+3:30 (IRST)
  - Summer (DST): UTC+4:30 (IRDT)

Pol Borideh (Persian: پل بريده, also Romanized as Pol Borīdeh) is a village in Rud Zard Rural District, in the Central District of Bagh-e Malek County, Khuzestan Province, Iran. At the 2006 census, its population was 80, in 16 families.
