= Ab Chendar, Chelo =

Ab Chendar اب چندار
- Village
- Location within Iran
- Coordinates: 32°23′25″N 49°37′18″E
- Country: Iran
- Province: Khuzestan
- County: Andika
- Bakhsh: Chelo
- Rural District: Lalar and Katak

Population (2006)
  - Total: 143
- Time zone: UTC+3:30 (IRST)
  - Summer (DST): UTC+4:30 (IRDT)

Ab Chendar (Persian: اب چندار, also Romanized as Āb Chendār; also known as Ābchendār) is a village in Lalar and Katak Rural District, Chelo District, Andika County, Khuzestan Province, Iran. At the 2006 census, its population was 143, in 27 families.
