= Deh Sukhteh, Falard =

Deh Sukhteh ده سوخته
- Village
- Location within Iran
- Coordinates: 31°18′04″N 51°12′47″E
- Country: Iran
- Province: Chaharmahal and Bakhtiari
- County: Lordegan
- Bakhsh: Falard
- Rural District: Falard

Population (2006)
  - Total: 440
- Time zone: UTC+3:30 (IRST)
  - Summer (DST): UTC+4:30 (IRDT)

Deh Sukhteh (Persian: ده سوخته, also Romanized as Deh Sūkhteh) is a village in Falard Rural District, Falard District, Lordegan County, Chaharmahal and Bakhtiari Province, Iran. At the 2006 census, its population was 440, in 79 families. The village is populated by Lurs.
