= Lamab-e Gol Espid =

Lamab-e Gol Espid لم اب گل اسپيد
- Village
- Country: Iran
- Province: Kohgiluyeh and Boyer-Ahmad
- County: Boyer-Ahmad
- Bakhsh: Margown
- Rural District: Margown

Population (2006)
  - Total: 47
- Time zone: UTC+3:30 (IRST)
  - Summer (DST): UTC+4:30 (IRDT)

Lamab-e Gol Espid (Persian: لم اب گل اسپيد, also Romanized as Lamāb-e Gol Espīd) is a village in Margown Rural District, Margown District, Boyer-Ahmad County, Kohgiluyeh and Boyer-Ahmad Province, Iran. At the 2006 census, its population was 47, in 7 families.
