= Ab Chendar, Charusa =

Ab Chendar اب چندار
- Village
- Location within Iran
- Coordinates: 31°11′43″N 50°29′51″E
- Country: Iran
- Province: Kohgiluyeh and Boyer-Ahmad
- County: Kohgiluyeh
- Bakhsh: Charusa
- Rural District: Tayebi-ye Sarhadi-ye Gharbi

Population (2006)
  - Total: 588
- Time zone: UTC+3:30 (IRST)
  - Summer (DST): UTC+4:30 (IRDT)

Ab Chendar (Persian: اب چندار, also Romanized as Āb Chendār; also known as Ābchendār-e ‘Olyā) is a village in Tayebi-ye Sarhadi-ye Gharbi Rural District, Charusa District, Kohgiluyeh County, Kohgiluyeh and Boyer-Ahmad Province, Iran. According to the 2006 census, it had a population of 588 in 107 families.
