= Sargar-e Lir Tahrak =

Sargar-e Lir Tahrak سرگرليرتحرك
- Village
- Country: Iran
- Province: Kohgiluyeh and Boyer-Ahmad
- County: Kohgiluyeh
- Bakhsh: Central
- Rural District: Dehdasht-e Sharqi

Population (2006)
  - Total: 194
- Time zone: UTC+3:30 (IRST)
  - Summer (DST): UTC+4:30 (IRDT)

Sargar-e Lir Tahrak (Persian: سرگرليرتحرك, also Romanized as Sargar-e Līr Taḥrak) is a village in Dehdasht-e Sharqi Rural District, in the Central District of Kohgiluyeh County, Kohgiluyeh and Boyer-Ahmad Province, Iran. At the 2006 census, its population was 194, in 34 families.
