= Dowzariv =

Dowzariv دوزريو
- Village
- Location within Iran
- Coordinates: 30°20′20″N 55°11′54″E
- Country: Iran
- Province: Kerman
- County: Shahr-e Babak
- Bakhsh: Central
- Rural District: Madvarat

Population (2006)
  - Total: 17
- Time zone: UTC+3:30 (IRST)
  - Summer (DST): UTC+4:30 (IRDT)

Dowzariv (Persian: دوزريو, also Romanized as Dowzarīv; also known as Bādāmestān-e Pā’īn and Dowzarū’īyeh) is a village in Madvarat Rural District, in the Central District of Shahr-e Babak County, Kerman Province, Iran. At the 2006 census, its population was 17, in seven families.
