= Gardan-e Tol Bardangan =

Gardan-e Tol Bardangan گردن تل بردنگان
- Village
- Location within Iran
- Coordinates: 30°13′03″N 51°20′29″E
- Country: Iran
- Province: Fars
- County: Mamasani
- Bakhsh: Central
- Rural District: Bakesh-e Do

Population (2006)
  - Total: 370
- Time zone: UTC+3:30 (IRST)
  - Summer (DST): UTC+4:30 (IRDT)

Gardan-e Tol Bardangan (Persian: گردن تل بردنگان, also Romanized as Gardan-e Tol Bardangān; also known as Gardaneh-ye Tol Bardangān, Gardaneh-ye Tol-e Bardangān, and Gardan Tol) is a village in Bakesh-e Do Rural District, in the Central District of Mamasani County, Fars province, Iran. At the 2006 census, its population was 370, in 76 families.
