= Ab Chenaru, Kohgiluyeh and Boyer-Ahmad =

Ab Chenaru اب چنارو
- Village
- Location within Iran
- Coordinates: 30°39′13″N 51°27′06″E
- Country: Iran
- Province: Kohgiluyeh and Boyer-Ahmad
- County: Boyer-Ahmad
- Bakhsh: Central
- Rural District: Dasht-e Rum

Population (2006)
  - Total: 75
- Time zone: UTC+3:30 (IRST)
  - Summer (DST): UTC+4:30 (IRDT)

Ab Chenaru (Persian: اب چنارو, also Romanized as Āb Chenārū; also known as Āb Chenār) is a village in Dasht-e Rum Rural District, in the Central District of Boyer-Ahmad County, Kohgiluyeh and Boyer-Ahmad Province, Iran. At the 2006 census, its population was 75, in 15 families.
