= Ab Chenaru, Fars =

Ab Chenaru اب چنارو
- Village
- Location within Iran
- Coordinates: 28°33′15″N 52°36′54″E
- Country: Iran
- Province: Fars
- County: Firuzabad
- Bakhsh: Central
- Rural District: Jaydasht

Population (2006)
  - Total: 34
- Time zone: UTC+3:30 (IRST)
  - Summer (DST): UTC+4:30 (IRDT)

Ab Chenaru (Persian: اب چنارو, also Romanized as Āb Chenārū; also known as Āb Chenār) is a village in Jaydasht Rural District, in the Central District of Firuzabad County, Fars province, Iran. The population of Ab Chenaru was 34 people, spread between six families, in the 2006 census.
