= Manj Rural District =

Rural district in Chaharmahal and Bakhtiari province, Iran

Manj Rural District Persian: دهستان منج
- Rural District
- Location within Iran
- Coordinates: 31°34′N 50°37′E
- Country: Iran
- Province: Chaharmahal and Bakhtiari
- County: Lordegan
- District: Manj
- Established: 1987
- Capital: Manj-e Nesa

Population (2016)
  - Total: 8,573
- Time zone: UTC+3:30 (IRST)

Manj Rural District (Persian: دهستان منج) is in Manj District of Lordegan County, Chaharmahal and Bakhtiari province, Iran. It is administered from the city of Manj-e Nesa.

== Demographics ==
=== Population ===
At the time of the 2006 National Census, the rural district's population was 9,208 in 1,771 households. There were 8,161 inhabitants in 1,781 households at the following census of 2011. The 2016 census measured the population of the rural district as 8,573 in 2,231 households. The most populous of its 26 villages was Bideleh, with 1,807 people.

=== Other villages in the rural district ===
- Ab Bidak
- Pol Borideh
- Shahrak-e Mashk Duzan
- Varkohleh
