= Barez Rural District =

Rural district in Chaharmahal and Bakhtiari province, Iran

Barez Rural District Persian: دهستان بارز
- Rural District
- Location within Iran
- Coordinates: 31°31′N 50°29′E
- Country: Iran
- Province: Chaharmahal and Bakhtiari
- County: Lordegan
- District: Manj
- Established: 1987
- Capital: Qaleh-ye Madraseh

Population (2016)
  - Total: 7,933
- Time zone: UTC+3:30 (IRST)

Barez Rural District (Persian: دهستان بارز) is in Manj District of Lordegan County, Chaharmahal and Bakhtiari province, Iran. Its capital is the village of Qaleh-ye Madraseh.

== Demographics ==
=== Population ===
At the time of the 2006 National Census, the rural district's population was 8,024 in 1,495 households. There were 8,385 inhabitants in 1,795 households at the following census of 2011. The 2016 census measured the population of the rural district as 7,933 in 2,014 households. The most populous of its 69 villages was Deh Now-ye Barez, with 1,171 people.

=== Other villages in the rural district ===
- Ab Chenar-e Sofla
- Cheshmeh Khani
- Gowd Sar
- Miyanju
- Nasirabad
