= Chin Rural District =

Rural district in Kohgiluyeh and Boyer-Ahmad province, Iran

Chin Rural District Persian: دهستان چين
- Rural District
- Location within Iran
- Coordinates: 31°02′55″N 50°50′24″E
- Country: Iran
- Province: Kohgiluyeh and Boyer-Ahmad
- County: Boyer-Ahmad
- District: Ludab
- Capital: Zafartehalayi

Population (2016)
  - Total: 3,667
- Time zone: UTC+3:30 (IRST)

Chin Rural District (Persian: دهستان چين) is in Ludab District of Boyer-Ahmad County, Kohgiluyeh and Boyer-Ahmad province, Iran. Its capital is the village of Zafartehalayi.

== Demographics ==
=== Population ===
At the time of the 2006 National Census, the rural district's population was 4,879 in 948 households. There were 4,332 inhabitants in 958 households at the following census of 2011. The 2016 census measured the population of the rural district as 3,667 in 919 households. The most populous of its 60 villages was Zafartehalayi, with 362 people.
