= Manj District =

District in Chaharmahal and Bakhtiari province, Iran

Manj District Persian: بخش منج
- District
- Location within Iran
- Coordinates: 31°32′N 50°32′E
- Country: Iran
- Province: Chaharmahal and Bakhtiari
- County: Lordegan
- Established: 2001
- Capital: Manj-e Nesa

Population (2016)
  - Total: 17,998
- Time zone: UTC+3:30 (IRST)

Manj District (Persian: بخش منج) is in Lordegan County, Chaharmahal and Bakhtiari province, Iran. Its capital is the city of Manj-e Nesa.

== History ==
Three villages merged to create the city of Manj-e Nesa in 2011.

== Demographics ==
=== Population ===
At the time of the 2006 National Census, the district's population was 17,232 in 3,266 households. The following census in 2011 counted 18,032 people in 3,914 households. The 2016 census measured the population of the district as 17,998 inhabitants living in 4,626 households.

=== Administrative divisions ===
Manj District Population
Administrative Divisions	2006	2011	2016
Barez RD	8,024	8,385	7,933
Manj RD	9,208	8,161	8,573
Manj-e Nesa (city)		1,486	1,492
Total	17,232	18,032	17,998
RD = Rural District
