= Ludab Rural District =

Rural district in Kohgiluyeh and Boyer-Ahmad province, Iran

Ludab Rural District Persian: دهستان لوداب
- Rural District
- Location within Iran
- Coordinates: 31°00′10″N 50°49′11″E
- Country: Iran
- Province: Kohgiluyeh and Boyer-Ahmad
- County: Boyer-Ahmad
- District: Ludab
- Capital: Garab-e Sofla

Population (2016)
  - Total: 7,083
- Time zone: UTC+3:30 (IRST)

Ludab Rural District (Persian: دهستان لوداب) is in Ludab District of Boyer-Ahmad County, Kohgiluyeh and Boyer-Ahmad province, Iran. It is administered from the city of Garab-e Sofla.

== Demographics ==
=== Population ===
At the time of the 2006 National Census, the rural district's population was 9,392 in 1,864 households. There were 7,763 inhabitants in 1,795 households at the following census of 2011. The 2016 census measured the population of the rural district as 7,083 in 1,858 households. The most populous of its 100 villages was Ab Murd-e Dam Ludab, with 572 people.
