= Ludab District =

District in Kohgiluyeh and Boyer-Ahmad province, Iran

Ludab District Persian: بخش لوداب
- District
- Location within Iran
- Coordinates: 31°00′21″N 50°49′11″E
- Country: Iran
- Province: Kohgiluyeh and Boyer-Ahmad
- County: Boyer-Ahmad
- Capital: Garab-e Sofla

Population (2016)
  - Total: 11,295
- Time zone: UTC+3:30 (IRST)

Ludab District (Persian: بخش لوداب) is in Boyer-Ahmad County, Kohgiluyeh and Boyer-Ahmad province, Iran. Its capital is the city of Garab-e Sofla.

== Demographics ==
=== Population ===
At the time of the 2006 National Census, the district's population was 14,687 in 2,896 households. The following census in 2011 counted 12,587 people in 2,853 households. The 2016 census measured the population of the district as 11,295 inhabitants in 2,902 households.

=== Administrative divisions ===
Ludab District Population
| Administrative Divisions | 2006 | 2011 | 2016 |
|---|---|---|---|
| Chin RD | 4,879 | 4,332 | 3,667 |
| Ludab RD | 9,392 | 7,763 | 7,083 |
| Garab-e Sofla (city) | 416 | 492 | 545 |
| Total | 14,687 | 12,587 | 11,295 |
RD = Rural District
