= Gargar =

Gargar may refer to:

- Gargar, Armenia
- Gərgər, Azerbaijan
- Gargar-e Paini, Iran
- Gargar, Chaharmahal and Bakhtiari, Iran
- Gargar, Lorestan, Iran
- Gargar, Khuzestan, Iran
- Gargar-e Sofla, Khuzestan, Iran
- Gargar River, Iran
- Hadishahr, East Azerbaijan, Iran, also known as Gargar
- Qarqar, Syria
- Yüksekova, Turkey

== See also ==
- Gargareans
- Garga (disambiguation)
- Gargar-e Sofla (disambiguation)
- Gerger, Iran (disambiguation)
- Gorgor (disambiguation)
- Korkor (disambiguation)
- Qarqar (Karkar) (disambiguation)
