= Sarband (disambiguation) =

Sarband or Sar-e Band may refer to:

- Sarband, an early music ensemble focusing on connections between European, Islamic and Jewish music

== Places ==
in Iran

- Sarband, Ardabil, a village in Ardabil Province, Iran
- Shazand (formerly known as Sarband), a district or town in the Markazi Province, Iran
- Sarband, Bandar Abbas, a village in Hormozgan Province, Iran
- Sarband-e Parangi, a village in Hormozgan Province, Iran
- Sarband, Rudan, a village in Hormozgan Province, Iran
- Sar Band, Jiroft, a village in Kerman Province, Iran
- Sar Band-e Kasur, a village in Kerman Province, Iran
- Sarband-e Deh Di, a village in Khuzestan Province, Iran
- Sarband-e Pain, a village in Khuzestan Province, Iran
- Sarband, Markazi, a village in Markazi Province, Iran
- Sarband-e Gaviad, a village in South Khorasan Province, Iran
- Sarband District (Iran), an administrative subdivision of Iran

in Tajikistan

- Sarband, Sughd, a village in Sughd Region
- Sarband, a former name of Levakant, a city in Khatlon Region
- Sarband District, Khatlon Region, Tajikistan
