= Agacheri (disambiguation) =

Ağaçeri, Aghajari, or Aqajari is a historical Turkmen tribe. It may also refer to:

== Places in Iran ==
- Aghajari, a city in Khuzestan province
  - Aghajari Rural District
  - Aghajari County
  - Aghajari Airport
  - Aghajari oil field
- Aghajari, East Azerbaijan, a village in East Azerbaijan province
- Aghajari, West Azerbaijan, a village in West Azerbaijan province
- Aghcheh Rud, also known as Aqa Jari, a village in East Azerbaijan province
- Aqa Jari, Zanjan, a village in Zanjan province
- Aqa Jeri, a village in Kurdistan province

== People ==
- Hashem Aghajari (born 1957), Iranian historian
