= Ab Baran-e Do =

Village in Khuzestan province, Iran

Ab Baran-e Do Persian: اب باران دو
- Village
- Location within Iran
- Coordinates: 30°45′18″N 49°55′30″E
- Country: Iran
- Province: Khuzestan
- County: Aghajari
- District: Julaki
- Rural District: Ab Baran

Population (2016)
  - Total: 1,420
- Time zone: UTC+3:30 (IRST)

Ab Baran-e Do (Persian: اب باران دو) (Note: Also romanized as Āb Bārān-e Do; also known as Āb Bārān) is a village in, and the capital of, Ab Baran Rural District of Julaki District, Aghajari County, Khuzestan province, Iran.

== Demographics ==
=== Population ===
At the time of the 2006 National Census, the village's population was 1,022 in 194 households, when it was in the former Julaki Rural District (Note: Renamed Sar Julaki Rural District) of Jayezan District, Omidiyeh County. The following census in 2011 counted 1,242 people in 270 households. The 2016 census measured the population of the village as 1,420 people in 349 households, by which time the rural district had been separated from the county in the establishment of Aghajari County. The rural district was transferred to the new Julaki District and renamed Sar Julaki Rural District. Ab Baran-e Do was transferred to Ab Baran Rural District created in the district. It was the most populous village in its rural district.
