= Eslamabad, Omidiyeh =

Village in Khuzestan province, Iran

Eslamabad Persian: اسلام اباد
- Village
- Location within Iran
- Coordinates: 30°50′30″N 49°52′49″E
- Country: Iran
- Province: Khuzestan
- County: Omidiyeh
- District: Jayezan
- Rural District: Jayezan

Population (2016)
  - Total: 1,881
- Time zone: UTC+3:30 (IRST)

Eslamabad (Persian: اسلام اباد) (Note: Also romanized as Eslāmābād; also known as Qal‘eh and Qal‘eh Now) is a village in Jayezan Rural District, Jayezan District, Omidiyeh County, Khuzestan province, Iran.

== Demographics ==
=== Population ===
At the time of the 2006 National Census, the village's population was 1,720 in 340 households, when it was in Julaki Rural District. The following census in 2011 counted 2,025 people in 489 households. The 2016 census measured the population of the village as 1,881 people in 487 households, by which time the rural district had been separated from the county to join Aghajari County. The village was transferred to Jayezan Rural District. It was the most populous village in its rural district.
