= Sar Julaki =

Village in Khuzestan province, Iran

Sar Julaki Persian: سرجولكي
- Village
- Location within Iran
- Coordinates: 30°48′31″N 49°53′56″E
- Country: Iran
- Province: Khuzestan
- County: Aghajari
- District: Julaki
- Rural District: Sar Julaki

Population (2016)
  - Total: 1,005
- Time zone: UTC+3:30 (IRST)

Sar Julaki (Persian: سرجولكي) (Note: Also romanized as Sar Joulakī and Sar Jūlakī) is a village in, and the capital of, Sar Julaki Rural District (Note: Formerly Julaki Rural District) of Julaki District, Aghajari County, Khuzestan province, Iran. The previous capital of the rural district was the village of Julaki, now a city.

== Demographics ==
=== Population ===
At the time of the 2006 National Census, the village's population was 1,004 in 198 households, when it was in Julaki Rural District (Note: Renamed Sar Julaki Rural District) of Jayezan District, Omidiyeh County. The following census in 2011 counted 1,057 people in 243 households. The 2016 census measured the population of the village as 1,005 people in 260 households, by which time the rural district had been separated from the county in the establishment of Aghajari County. The rural district was transferred to the new Julaki District and renamed Sar Julaki Rural District.
