= Ashareh =

Ashareh (Persian: عشاره) may refer to:

- Ashareh-ye Bozorg, Ahvaz County
- Ashareh-ye Kuchek, Ahvaz County
- Ashareh-ye Olya, Omidiyeh County
- Ashareh-ye Sofla, Omidiyeh County
