= Amir ol Mowmenin =

Amir ol Mowmenin or Amir ol Momenin (Persian: اميرالمومنين) may refer to:

- Amir ol Mowmenin, Andika, Khuzestan Province
- Amir ol Mowmenin, Omidiyeh, Khuzestan Province
- Amir ol Mowmenin, Bahmai, Kohgiluyeh and Boyer-Ahmad Province
- Amir ol Mowmenin, Kohgiluyeh, Kohgiluyeh and Boyer-Ahmad Province
