= Qatrani =

Qatrani (Persian: قطراني) may refer to:

- Getrani
- Qatrani-ye Olya Yek
- Qatrani-ye Sofla Yek
- Jebel Qatrani Formation
- Ali Faraj Qatrani, Libyan politician
- Hussein Al-Qatrani, Libyan politician
