= Majnun, Khuzestan =

Majnun مجنون
- Village
- Location within Iran
- Coordinates: 30°43′49″N 49°43′24″E
- Country: Iran
- Province: Khuzestan
- County: Omidiyeh
- Bakhsh: Central
- Rural District: Chah Salem

Population (2006)
  - Total: 484
- Time zone: UTC+3:30 (IRST)
  - Summer (DST): UTC+4:30 (IRDT)

Majnun (Persian: مجنون, also Romanized as Majnūn) is a village in Chah Salem Rural District, in the Central District of Omidiyeh County, Khuzestan Province, Iran. At the 2006 census, its population was 484, in 83 families.
