= Obudehalis =

Obudehalis ابودهاليس
- Village
- Location within Iran
- Coordinates: 30°50′15″N 49°37′08″E
- Country: Iran
- Province: Khuzestan
- County: Omidiyeh
- Bakhsh: Central
- Rural District: Chah Salem

Population (2006)
  - Total: 190
- Time zone: UTC+3:30 (IRST)
  - Summer (DST): UTC+4:30 (IRDT)

Obudehalis (Persian: ابودهاليس, also Romanized as Obūdehālīs; also known as Abū Dahālīs) is a village in Chah Salem Rural District, in the Central District of Omidiyeh County, Khuzestan Province, Iran. At the 2006 census, its population was 190, in 38 families.
