= Gerger (disambiguation) =

Gerger may refer to:

- Gerger, a district in Turkey
- Garrgarr, Lori Province, Armenia
- Herher, Vayots Dzor Province, Armenia
- Gərgər, Azerbaijan
- Qarqar, Azerbaijan
- Gerger, Iran (disambiguation)
