= Khazineh-ye Olya =

Khazineh-ye Olya خزينه عليا
- Village
- Location within Iran
- Coordinates: 30°43′13″N 49°32′06″E
- Country: Iran
- Province: Khuzestan
- County: Omidiyeh
- Bakhsh: Central
- Rural District: Chah Salem

Population (2006)
  - Total: 65
- Time zone: UTC+3:30 (IRST)
  - Summer (DST): UTC+4:30 (IRDT)

Khazineh-ye Olya (Persian: خزينه عليا, also Romanized as Khazīneh-ye ‘Olyā; also known as Khazīneh-ye Bālā) is a village in Chah Salem Rural District, in the Central District of Omidiyeh County, Khuzestan Province, Iran. At the 2006 census, its population was 65, in 15 families.
