= Godar Chiti =

Godar Chiti گدارچيتي
- Village
- Location within Iran
- Coordinates: 30°35′10″N 49°49′37″E
- Country: Iran
- Province: Khuzestan
- County: Omidiyeh
- Bakhsh: Central
- Rural District: Asiab

Population (2006)
  - Total: 459
- Time zone: UTC+3:30 (IRST)
  - Summer (DST): UTC+4:30 (IRDT)

Godar Chiti (Persian: گدارچيتي, also Romanized as Godār Chītīand Godār Cheytī) is a village in Asiab Rural District, in the Central District of Omidiyeh County, Khuzestan Province, Iran. At the 2006 census, its population was 459, in 87 families.
