= Zoveyneh =

Zoveyneh زوينه
- Village
- Location within Iran
- Coordinates: 30°40′00″N 49°29′34″E
- Country: Iran
- Province: Khuzestan
- County: Omidiyeh
- Bakhsh: Central
- Rural District: Chah Salem

Population (2006)
  - Total: 54
- Time zone: UTC+3:30 (IRST)
  - Summer (DST): UTC+4:30 (IRDT)

Zoveyneh (Persian: زوينه, also Romanized as Zoveynah; also known as Zoveneh and Zūyneh) is a village in Chah Salem Rural District, in the Central District of Omidiyeh County, Khuzestan Province, Iran. At the 2006 census, its population was 54, in 10 families.
