= Salehak =

Salehak صالحك
- Village
- Location within Iran
- Coordinates: 30°31′10″N 49°57′50″E
- Country: Iran
- Province: Khuzestan
- County: Omidiyeh
- Bakhsh: Central
- Rural District: Asiab

Population (2006)
  - Total: 205
- Time zone: UTC+3:30 (IRST)
  - Summer (DST): UTC+4:30 (IRDT)

Salehak (Persian: صالحك, also Romanized as Şāleḩak) is a village in Asiab Rural District, in the Central District of Omidiyeh County, Khuzestan Province, Iran. At the 2006 census, its population was 205, in 40 families.
