= Tang-e Jafar =

Tang-e Jafar تنگجعفر
- Village
- Location within Iran
- Coordinates: 30°38′41″N 49°47′43″E
- Country: Iran
- Province: Khuzestan
- County: Omidiyeh
- Bakhsh: Central
- Rural District: Chah Salem

Population (2006)
  - Total: 244
- Time zone: UTC+3:30 (IRST)
  - Summer (DST): UTC+4:30 (IRDT)

Tang-e Jafar (Persian: تنگجعفر, also Romanized as Tang-e Ja‘far and Tang Ja‘far; also known as Tangay Jafar) is a village in Chah Salem Rural District, in the Central District of Omidiyeh County, Khuzestan Province, Iran. At the 2006 census, its population was 244, in 37 families.
