= Shah Nabi-ye Olya =

Shah Nabi-ye Olya شاه نبي عليا
- Village
- Location within Iran
- Coordinates: 30°51′51″N 49°36′26″E
- Country: Iran
- Province: Khuzestan
- County: Omidiyeh
- Bakhsh: Central
- Rural District: Chah Salem

Population (2006)
  - Total: 273
- Time zone: UTC+3:30 (IRST)
  - Summer (DST): UTC+4:30 (IRDT)

Shah Nabi-ye Olya (Persian: شاه نبي عليا, also Romanized as Shāh Nabī-ye ‘Olyā; also known as Shāh Nabī and Shāh Nabī Bālā) is a village in Chah Salem Rural District, in the Central District of Omidiyeh County, Khuzestan Province, Iran. At the 2006 census, its population was 273, in 43 families.
