= Adabis =

Adabis عدعبيس
- Village
- Location within Iran
- Coordinates: 30°44′16″N 49°33′12″E
- Country: Iran
- Province: Khuzestan
- County: Omidiyeh
- Bakhsh: Central
- Rural District: Chah Salem

Population (2006)
  - Total: 77
- Time zone: UTC+3:30 (IRST)
  - Summer (DST): UTC+4:30 (IRDT)

Adabis (Persian: عدعبيس, also Romanized as ‘Adābīs and ‘Ad ‘Abīs) is a village in Chah Salem Rural District, in the Central District of Omidiyeh County, Khuzestan Province, Iran. At the 2006 census, its population was 77, in 12 families.
