= Vali, Iran =

Vali ولي
- Village
- Location within Iran
- Coordinates: 30°53′38″N 49°50′25″E
- Country: Iran
- Province: Khuzestan
- County: Omidiyeh
- Bakhsh: Jayezan
- Rural District: Jayezan

Population (2006)
  - Total: 358
- Time zone: UTC+3:30 (IRST)
  - Summer (DST): UTC+4:30 (IRDT)

Vali (Persian: ولي, also Romanized as Valī) is a village in Jayezan Rural District, Jayezan District, Omidiyeh County, Khuzestan Province, Iran. At the 2006 census, its population was 358, in 70 families.
