= Safar, Iran =

Safar صفر
- Village
- Location within Iran
- Coordinates: 30°54′18″N 49°50′40″E
- Country: Iran
- Province: Khuzestan
- County: Omidiyeh
- Bakhsh: Jayezan
- Rural District: Jayezan

Population (2006)
  - Total: 1,103
- Time zone: UTC+3:30 (IRST)
  - Summer (DST): UTC+4:30 (IRDT)

Safar (Persian: صفر, also Romanized as Şafar) is a village in Jayezan Rural District, Jayezan District, Omidiyeh County, Khuzestan Province, Iran. At the 2006 census, its population was 1,103, in 234 families.
