= Duneh =

Duneh دونه
- Village
- Location within Iran
- Coordinates: 30°46′18″N 49°40′50″E
- Country: Iran
- Province: Khuzestan
- County: Omidiyeh
- Bakhsh: Central
- Rural District: Chah Salem

Population (2006)
  - Total: 559
- Time zone: UTC+3:30 (IRST)
  - Summer (DST): UTC+4:30 (IRDT)

Duneh (Persian: دونه, also Romanized as Dūneh and Downah) is a village in Chah Salem Rural District, in the Central District of Omidiyeh County, Khuzestan Province, Iran. At the 2006 census, its population was 559, in 106 families.
