= Borj, Khuzestan =

Borj برج
- Village
- Location within Iran
- Coordinates: 30°57′41″N 49°46′43″E
- Country: Iran
- Province: Khuzestan
- County: Omidiyeh
- Bakhsh: Jayezan
- Rural District: Jayezan

Population (2006)
  - Total: 129
- Time zone: UTC+3:30 (IRST)
  - Summer (DST): UTC+4:30 (IRDT)

Borj (Persian: برج) is a village in Jayezan Rural District, Jayezan District, Omidiyeh County, Khuzestan Province, Iran. At the 2006 census, its population was 129, in 23 families.
