= Abu Tarfaiyeh =

Abu Tarfaiyeh ابوطرفايه
- Village
- Location within Iran
- Coordinates: 30°37′51″N 49°29′56″E
- Country: Iran
- Province: Khuzestan
- County: Omidiyeh
- Bakhsh: Central
- Rural District: Chah Salem

Population (2006)
  - Total: 33
- Time zone: UTC+3:30 (IRST)
  - Summer (DST): UTC+4:30 (IRDT)

Abu Tarfaiyeh (Persian: ابوطرفايه, also Romanized as Abū Ţarfā’īyeh and Abū Tarfāyeh; also known as Abū Ţarfāyeh-ye Pā’īn) is a village in Chah Salem Rural District, in the Central District of Omidiyeh County, Khuzestan Province, Iran. At the 2006 census, its population was 33, in 6 families.
