= Shahrak-e Azadi =

Shahrak-e Azadi (Persian: شهرك ازادي) may refer to:

- Shahrak-e Azadi, Ahvaz
- Shahrak-e Azadi, Andimeshk
- Shahrak-e Azadi, Omidiyeh
- Shahrak-e Azadi, Ramshir
