= Jayezan-e Kohneh =

Jayezan-e Kohneh جايزان كهنه
- Village
- Location within Iran
- Coordinates: 30°53′54″N 49°48′17″E
- Country: Iran
- Province: Khuzestan
- County: Omidiyeh
- Bakhsh: Jayezan
- Rural District: Jayezan

Population (2006)
  - Total: 318
- Time zone: UTC+3:30 (IRST)
  - Summer (DST): UTC+4:30 (IRDT)

Jayezan-e Kohneh (Persian: جايزان كهنه, also Romanized as Jāyezān-e Kohneh and Jāyzānkohneh; also known as Jāizān and Jāyezān) is a village in Jayezan Rural District, Jayezan District, Omidiyeh County, Khuzestan Province, Iran. At the 2006 census, its population was 318, in 63 families.
