= Cham Nezami =

Cham Nezami چم نظامي
- Village
- Location within Iran
- Coordinates: 30°42′43″N 49°55′36″E
- Country: Iran
- Province: Khuzestan
- County: Aghajari
- Bakhsh: Joulaki
- Rural District: Ab Baran

Population (2011)
  - Total: 49
- Time zone: UTC+3:30 (IRST)
  - Summer (DST): UTC+4:30 (IRDT)

Cham Nezami (Persian: چم نظامي, also Romanized as Cham Nez̧āmī) is a village in Ab Baran Rural District, Joulaki District, Aghajari County, Khuzestan Province, Iran. At the 2011 census, its population was 49, in 15 families.
