= Abu Masul =

Abu Masul ابوماصول
- Village
- Location within Iran
- Coordinates: 30°41′00″N 49°31′19″E
- Country: Iran
- Province: Khuzestan
- County: Omidiyeh
- Bakhsh: Central
- Rural District: Chah Salem

Population (2006)
  - Total: 20
- Time zone: UTC+3:30 (IRST)
  - Summer (DST): UTC+4:30 (IRDT)

Abu Masul (Persian: ابوماصول, also Romanized as Abū Māşūl) is a village in Chah Salem Rural District, in the Central District of Omidiyeh County, Khuzestan Province, Iran. At the 2006 census, its population was 20, in 4 families.
