= Kheyt =

Kheyt (Persian: خيط) may refer to:

- Kheyt, Mosharrahat
- Kheyt-e Amareh
- Kheyt-e Zobeyd
