= Muleh =

Muleh مولح
- Village
- Location within Iran
- Coordinates: 30°34′01″N 49°24′37″E
- Country: Iran
- Province: Khuzestan
- County: Omidiyeh
- Bakhsh: Central
- Rural District: Chah Salem

Population (2006)
  - Total: 34
- Time zone: UTC+3:30 (IRST)
  - Summer (DST): UTC+4:30 (IRDT)

Muleh (Persian: مولح, also Romanized as Mūleh and Mowleh) is a village in Chah Salem Rural District, in the Central District of Omidiyeh County, Khuzestan Province, Iran. At the 2006 census, its population was 34, in 8 families.
