= Ab Baran-e Yek =

Ab Baran-e Yek اب باران يك
- Village
- Location within Iran
- Coordinates: 30°45′15″N 49°55′34″E
- Country: Iran
- Province: Khuzestan
- County: Aghajari
- Bakhsh: Joulaki
- Rural District: Ab Baran

Population (2011)
  - Total: 78
- Time zone: UTC+3:30 (IRST)
  - Summer (DST): UTC+4:30 (IRDT)

Ab Baran-e Yek (Persian: اب باران يك, also Romanized as Āb Bārān-e Yek; also known as Āb Bārān and Āb-e-Bārān) is a village in Ab Baran Rural District, Joulaki District, Aghajari County, Khuzestan province, Iran. At the 2011 census, its population was 78 in 18 families.
