= Hadi Khani, Khuzestan =

Hadi Khani هادي خاني
- Village
- Location within Iran
- Coordinates: 30°46′20″N 49°55′06″E
- Country: Iran
- Province: Khuzestan
- County: Aghajari
- Bakhsh: Joulaki
- Rural District: Ab Baran

Population (2011)
  - Total: 371
- Time zone: UTC+3:30 (IRST)
  - Summer (DST): UTC+4:30 (IRDT)

Hadi Khani (Persian: هادي خاني, also Romanized as Hādī Khānī; also known as Jahādābād) is a village in Ab Baran Rural District, Joulaki District, Aghajari County, Khuzestan Province, Iran. At the 2011 census, its population was 371, in 84 families.
