= Shahrak-e Balal =

Shahrak-e Balal شهرك بلال
- Village
- Location within Iran
- Coordinates: 30°49′45″N 49°53′06″E
- Country: Iran
- Province: Khuzestan
- County: Omidiyeh
- Bakhsh: Jayezan
- Rural District: Julaki

Population (2006)
  - Total: 706
- Time zone: UTC+3:30 (IRST)
  - Summer (DST): UTC+4:30 (IRDT)

Shahrak-e Balal (Persian: شهرك بلال, also Romanized as Shahrak-e Balāl) is a village in Julaki Rural District, Jayezan District, Omidiyeh County, Khuzestan Province, Iran. At the 2006 census, its population was 706, in 110 families.
