= Kombardeh =

Kombardeh كمبرده
- Village
- Location within Iran
- Coordinates: 30°57′09″N 49°46′58″E
- Country: Iran
- Province: Khuzestan
- County: Omidiyeh
- Bakhsh: Jayezan
- Rural District: Jayezan

Population (2006)
  - Total: 59
- Time zone: UTC+3:30 (IRST)
  - Summer (DST): UTC+4:30 (IRDT)

Kombardeh (Persian: كمبرده, also Romanized as Kombordeh; also known as Kombārd) is a village in Jayezan Rural District, Jayezan District, Omidiyeh County, Khuzestan Province, Iran. At the 2006 census, its population was 59, in 14 families.
