= Cheshmeh-ye Cham Nezami =

Cheshmeh-ye Cham Nezami چشمه چم نظامي
- Village
- Location within Iran
- Coordinates: 30°43′42″N 49°54′57″E
- Country: Iran
- Province: Khuzestan
- County: Aghajari
- Bakhsh: Joulaki
- Rural District: Ab Baran

Population (2011)
  - Total: 36
- Time zone: UTC+3:30 (IRST)
  - Summer (DST): UTC+4:30 (IRDT)

Cheshmeh-ye Cham Nezami (Persian: چشمه چم نظامي, also Romanized as Cheshmeh-ye Cham Nez̧āmī) is a village in Ab Baran Rural District, Joulaki District, Aghajari County, Khuzestan Province, Iran. At the 2011 census, its population was 36, in 8 families.
