= Shahrak-e Horr =

Shahrak-e Horr شهرك حر
- Village
- Location within Iran
- Coordinates: 30°48′58″N 49°53′37″E
- Country: Iran
- Province: Khuzestan
- County: Omidiyeh
- Bakhsh: Jayezan
- Rural District: Julaki

Population (2006)
  - Total: 988
- Time zone: UTC+3:30 (IRST)
  - Summer (DST): UTC+4:30 (IRDT)

Shahrak-e Horr (Persian: شهرك حر, also Romanized as Shahrak-e Ḩorr and Shahrak-e Ḩor) is a village in Julaki Rural District, Jayezan District, Omidiyeh County, Khuzestan Province, Iran. At the 2006 census, its population was 988, in 162 families.
