= Shahrake Hor, Khuzestan =

Shahrake Hor شهرک حر
- village
- Location within Iran
- Coordinates: 30°49′15″N 49°53′09″E
- Country: Iran
- Province: Khuzestan
- County: Aghajari
- Bakhsh: Joulaki
- Rural District: Sar Joulaki

Population (2011)
  - Total: 1,121
- Time zone: UTC+3:30 (IRST)
  - Summer (DST): UTC+4:30 (IRDT)

Shahrake Hor (Persian: شهرک حر, also Romanized as Shahrake Hor ) is a village in Sar Joulaki Rural District, Joulaki District, Aghajari County, Khuzestan Province, Iran. At the 2011 census, its population was 1,121, in 241 families.
