= Boneh-ye Nafal =

Boneh-ye Nafal بنه نفل
- Village
- Location within Iran
- Coordinates: 31°00′19″N 49°42′43″E
- Country: Iran
- Province: Khuzestan
- County: Omidiyeh
- Bakhsh: Jayezan
- Rural District: Jayezan

Population (2006)
  - Total: 122
- Time zone: UTC+3:30 (IRST)
  - Summer (DST): UTC+4:30 (IRDT)

Boneh-ye Nafal (Persian: بنه نفل, also Romanized as Boneh Nafal; also known as Nafal) is a village in Jayezan Rural District, Jayezan District, Omidiyeh County, Khuzestan Province, Iran. At the 2006 census, its population was 122, in 22 families.
