= Hababeh =

Hababeh or Hobbabeh (Persian: حبابه) may refer to:

- Hababeh-ye Olya
- Hababeh-ye Sofla
- Hababeh-ye Vosta
