= Karfanj =

Karfanj كرفنج
- Village
- Location within Iran
- Coordinates: 30°58′19″N 49°45′52″E
- Country: Iran
- Province: Khuzestan
- County: Omidiyeh
- Bakhsh: Jayezan
- Rural District: Jayezan

Population (2006)
  - Total: 176
- Time zone: UTC+3:30 (IRST)
  - Summer (DST): UTC+4:30 (IRDT)

Karfanj (Persian: كرفنج, also Romanized as Karfenj; also known as Karfanj Bālā, Karfanj-e Bālā, and Karfanj-e ‘Olyā) is a village in Jayezan Rural District, Jayezan District, Omidiyeh County, Khuzestan Province, Iran. At the 2006 census, its population was 176, in 35 families.
