= Sur-e Meqdad =

Sur-e Meqdad سورمقداد
- Village
- Location within Iran
- Coordinates: 30°31′36″N 49°53′36″E
- Country: Iran
- Province: Khuzestan
- County: Omidiyeh
- Bakhsh: Central
- Rural District: Asiab

Population (2006)
  - Total: 206
- Time zone: UTC+3:30 (IRST)
  - Summer (DST): UTC+4:30 (IRDT)

Sur-e Meqdad (Persian: سورمقداد, also Romanized as Sūr-e Meqdād and Sūr-e Moqdād; also known as Sūd Moghdād, Sūr-e Meghdād, and Var-e Meqdād) is a village in Asiab Rural District, in the Central District of Omidiyeh County, Khuzestan Province, Iran. At the 2006 census, its population was 206, in 34 families.
