= Siah Gel, Khuzestan =

Siah Gel سياه گل
- Village
- Location within Iran
- Coordinates: 30°56′23″N 49°47′15″E
- Country: Iran
- Province: Khuzestan
- County: Omidiyeh
- Bakhsh: Jayezan
- Rural District: Jayezan

Population (2006)
  - Total: 282
- Time zone: UTC+3:30 (IRST)
  - Summer (DST): UTC+4:30 (IRDT)

Siah Gel (Persian: سياه گل, also Romanized as Sīāh Gel and Seyahgel; also known as Seyyed Kal) is a village in Jayezan Rural District, Jayezan District, Omidiyeh County, Khuzestan Province, Iran. At the 2006 census, its population was 282, in 59 families.
