= Bahriyeh =

Bahriyeh بحريه
- Village
- Location within Iran
- Coordinates: 30°37′28″N 49°46′10″E
- Country: Iran
- Province: Khuzestan
- County: Omidiyeh
- Bakhsh: Central
- Rural District: Chah Salem

Population (2006)
  - Total: 226
- Time zone: UTC+3:30 (IRST)
  - Summer (DST): UTC+4:30 (IRDT)

Bahriyeh (Persian: بحريه, also Romanized as Baḩrīyeh; also known as Barīyeh and Baria) is a village in Chah Salem Rural District, in the Central District of Omidiyeh County, Khuzestan Province, Iran. At the 2006 census, its population was 226, in 36 families.
