= Hoveyleh =

Hoveyleh حويله
- Village
- Location within Iran
- Coordinates: 30°39′20″N 49°45′05″E
- Country: Iran
- Province: Khuzestan
- County: Omidiyeh
- Bakhsh: Central
- Rural District: Chah Salem

Population (2006)
  - Total: 66
- Time zone: UTC+3:30 (IRST)
  - Summer (DST): UTC+4:30 (IRDT)

Hoveyleh (Persian: حويله, also Romanized as Ḩavīleh) is a village in Chah Salem Rural District, in the Central District of Omidiyeh County, Khuzestan Province, Iran. At the 2006 census, its population was 66, in 9 families.
