= Gorgor =

Gorgor or Gor Gor may refer to:

- Gorgor District, in Peru
- Gor Gor, Khuzestan, a village in Iran
- Gor Gor, Shadegan, a village in Khuzestan Province, Iran
- "Gor-Gor", a song by GWAR from America Must Be Destroyed
- Gorgor Special Forces, a Somali military unit

== See also ==
- Gargar (disambiguation)
