= Korkor =

Korkor may refer to:

== Places ==
- Korkor, Borujerd
- Korkor, Selseleh
- Qorqor (Persian: قرقر), a village in Isfahan Province, Iran

== Other ==
- Korkor (boat), a small rowing or sailing fishing canoe from the Marshall Islands

== See also ==
- Qarqar (disambiguation)
- Karkar (disambiguation)
- Gargar (disambiguation)
