= Chah Salem =

Village in Khuzestan province, Iran

Chah Salem Persian: چاه سالم
- Village
- Location within Iran
- Coordinates: 30°43′40″N 49°43′54″E
- Country: Iran
- Province: Khuzestan
- County: Omidiyeh
- District: Central
- Rural District: Chah Salem

Population (2016)
  - Total: 3,153
- Time zone: UTC+3:30 (IRST)

Chah Salem (Persian: چاه سالم) (Note: Also romanized as Chāh Sālem; also known as Chāy-e Sālem) is a village in, and the capital of, Chah Salem Rural District of the Central District of Omidiyeh County, Khuzestan province, Iran.

== Demographics ==
=== Population ===
At the time of the 2006 National Census, the village's population was 2,406 in 454 households. The following census in 2011 counted 2,914 people in 659 households. The 2016 census measured the population of the village as 3,153 people in 807 households. It was the most populous village in its rural district.
