= Nomreh Yek-e Bala =

Nomreh Yek-e Bala نمره يك بالا
- Village
- Location within Iran
- Coordinates: 30°46′00″N 49°44′00″E
- Country: Iran
- Province: Khuzestan
- County: Omidiyeh
- Bakhsh: Central
- Rural District: Chah Salem

Population (2006)
  - Total: 546
- Time zone: UTC+3:30 (IRST)
  - Summer (DST): UTC+4:30 (IRDT)

Nomreh Yek-e Bala (Persian: نمره يك بالا, also Romanized as Nomreh Yek-e Bālā; also known as Āyatollāh Montaz̧erī-ye Bālā and Nomreh Yek) is a village in Chah Salem Rural District, in the Central District of Omidiyeh County, Khuzestan Province, Iran. At the 2006 census, its population was 546, in 123 families.
