= Sarband-e Pain =

Sarband-e Pain سربندپايين
- Village
- Location within Iran
- Coordinates: 30°48′01″N 49°46′14″E
- Country: Iran
- Province: Khuzestan
- County: Omidiyeh
- Bakhsh: Jayezan
- Rural District: Julaki

Population (2006)
  - Total: 318
- Time zone: UTC+3:30 (IRST)
  - Summer (DST): UTC+4:30 (IRDT)

Sarband-e Pain (Persian: سربند پايين, also Romanized as Sarband-e Pā’īn; also known as Sar Band) is a village in Julaki Rural District, Jayezan District, Omidiyeh County, Khuzestan Province, Iran. At the 2006 census, its population was 318, in 75 families.
