= Qalandari, Khuzestan =

Qalandari قلندري
- Village
- Location within Iran
- Coordinates: 30°34′17″N 49°52′48″E
- Country: Iran
- Province: Khuzestan
- County: Omidiyeh
- Bakhsh: Central
- Rural District: Asiab

Population (2006)
  - Total: 167
- Time zone: UTC+3:30 (IRST)
  - Summer (DST): UTC+4:30 (IRDT)

Qalandari (Persian: قلندري, also Romanized as Qalandarī) is a village in Asiab Rural District, in the Central District of Omidiyeh County, Khuzestan Province, Iran. At the 2006 census, its population was 167, in 31 families.

55.909, 3.557
