= Hababeh-ye Sofla =

Hababeh-ye Sofla حبايه سفلي
- Village
- Location within Iran
- Coordinates: 30°38′45″N 49°46′14″E
- Country: Iran
- Province: Khuzestan
- County: Omidiyeh
- Bakhsh: Central
- Rural District: Chah Salem

Population (2006)
  - Total: 107
- Time zone: UTC+3:30 (IRST)
  - Summer (DST): UTC+4:30 (IRDT)

Hababeh-ye Sofla (Persian: حبايه سفلي, also Romanized as Ḩabābeh-ye Soflá; also known as Ḩabābeh-ye Pā’īn) is a village in Chah Salem Rural District, in the Central District of Omidiyeh County, Khuzestan Province, Iran. At the 2006 census, its population was 107, in 23 families.
