= Gargari-ye Olya =

Gargari-ye Olya گرگري عليا
- Village
- Location within Iran
- Coordinates: 30°33′23″N 49°54′00″E
- Country: Iran
- Province: Khuzestan
- County: Omidiyeh
- Bakhsh: Central
- Rural District: Asiab

Population (2006)
  - Total: 346
- Time zone: UTC+3:30 (IRST)
  - Summer (DST): UTC+4:30 (IRDT)

Gargari-ye Olya (Persian: گرگري عليا, also Romanized as Gargarī-ye ‘Olyā and Gorgorī-ye ‘Olyā; also known as Gargari Bālāi, Gargīrī-ye Bālā, Gorgorī, and Gorgorī-ye Bālā) is a village in Asiab Rural District, in the Central District of Omidiyeh County, Khuzestan Province, Iran. At the 2006 census, its population was 346, in 71 families.
