= Gerger, Azerbaijan =

Gerger, Azerbaijan may refer to:

- Gərgər, Azerbaijan
- Qarqar, Azerbaijan
