= Hababeh-ye Olya =

Hababeh-ye Olya حبايه عليا
- Village
- Location within Iran
- Coordinates: 30°40′15″N 49°46′09″E
- Country: Iran
- Province: Khuzestan
- County: Omidiyeh
- Bakhsh: Central
- Rural District: Chah Salem

Population (2006)
  - Total: 641
- Time zone: UTC+3:30 (IRST)
  - Summer (DST): UTC+4:30 (IRDT)

Hababeh-ye Olya (Persian: حبايه عليا, also Romanized as Ḩabābeh-ye ‘Olyā; also known as Ḩabābeh-ye Bālā) is a village in Chah Salem Rural District, in the Central District of Omidiyeh County, Khuzestan Province, Iran. At the 2006 census, its population was 641, in 116 families.
