= Kheyt-e Zobeyd =

Kheyt-e Zobeyd خيط زبيد
- Village
- Location within Iran
- Coordinates: 30°41′36″N 49°45′50″E
- Country: Iran
- Province: Khuzestan
- County: Omidiyeh
- Bakhsh: Central
- Rural District: Chah Salem

Population (2006)
  - Total: 88
- Time zone: UTC+3:30 (IRST)
  - Summer (DST): UTC+4:30 (IRDT)

Kheyt-e Zobeyd (Persian: خيط زبيد, also Romanized as Kheyţ-e Zobeyd; also known as Boneh-ye Ţāher) is a village in Chah Salem Rural District, in the Central District of Omidiyeh County, Khuzestan Province, Iran. At the 2006 census, its population was 88, in 20 families.
