= Ashareh-ye Sofla =

Ashareh-ye Sofla عشاره سفلي
- Village
- Location within Iran
- Coordinates: 30°38′59″N 49°46′56″E
- Country: Iran
- Province: Khuzestan
- County: Omidiyeh
- Bakhsh: Central
- Rural District: Chah Salem

Population (2006)
  - Total: 290
- Time zone: UTC+3:30 (IRST)
  - Summer (DST): UTC+4:30 (IRDT)

Ashareh-ye Sofla (Persian: عشاره سفلي, also Romanized as ‘Ashāreh-ye Soflá; also known as ‘Ashāreh-ye Pā’īn) is a village in Chah Salem Rural District, in the Central District of Omidiyeh County, Khuzestan Province, Iran. At the 2006 census, its population was 290, in 59 families.
