= Hababeh-ye Vosta =

Hababeh-ye Vosta حبابه وسطي
- Village
- Location within Iran
- Coordinates: 30°40′18″N 49°46′10″E
- Country: Iran
- Province: Khuzestan
- County: Omidiyeh
- Bakhsh: Central
- Rural District: Chah Salem

Population (2006)
  - Total: 127
- Time zone: UTC+3:30 (IRST)
  - Summer (DST): UTC+4:30 (IRDT)

Hababeh-ye Vosta (Persian: حبابه وسطي, also Romanized as Ḩabābeh-ye Vostá; also known as Ḩabābeh and Hobbābeh) is a village in Chah Salem Rural District, in the Central District of Omidiyeh County, Khuzestan Province, Iran. At the 2006 census, its population was 127, in 22 families.
