= Qalandari, Iran =

Qalandari (Persian: قلندري) may refer to:

- Qalandar, Ahar
- Qalandari, Hajjiabad, Hormozgan Province
- Qalandari, Khuzestan
- Qalandari, Yazd
