= Gargari =

Gargari or Gorgori or Gargiri (Persian: گرگري) may refer to:

- Gargari-ye Olya
- Gargari-ye Sofla
- Benedetta Gargari (born 1995), Italian actress
