= Central District (Aghajari County) =

District in Khuzestan province, Iran

Central District (Aghajari County) Persian: بخش مرکزی شهرستان آغاجاری
- District
- Location within Iran
- Coordinates: 30°41′01″N 49°52′19″E
- Country: Iran
- Province: Khuzestan
- County: Aghajari
- Capital: Aghajari

Population (2016)
  - Total: 11,919
- Time zone: UTC+3:30 (IRST)

The Central District of Aghajari County (Persian: بخش مرکزی شهرستان آغاجاری) is in Khuzestan province, Iran. Its capital is the city of Aghajari.

== History ==
After the 2011 National Census, Julaki Rural District (Note: Renamed Sar Julaki Rural District) was separated from Omidiyeh County, and Aghajari District from Behbahan County, in the establishment of Aghajari County, which was divided into two districts of two rural districts each, with Aghajari as its capital and only city.

== Demographics ==
=== Population ===
At the time of the 2016 census, the district's population was 11,919 inhabitants in 3,479 households.

=== Administrative divisions ===
Central District (Aghajari County) population
| Administrative divisions | 2016 |
|---|---|
| Aghajari RD | 7 |
| Aghajari (city) | 11,912 |
| Total | 11,919 |
RD = rural district
