= Ayatollah Montazeri (disambiguation) =

Ayatollah Montazeri is another term for Hussein-Ali Montazeri, an Iranian cleric who served as the deputy supreme leader of Iran from 1985 to 1989.

Ayatollah Montazeri may also refer to:

- Ayatollah Montazeri-ye Bala, village in Khuzestan Province, Iran
- Ayatollah Montazeri-ye Pain, village in Khuzestan Province, Iran
