= Karkar =

Karkar may refer to:

- Karkar, Selseleh, a village in Iran
- Karkar Island, an island in Papua New Guinea
- Karkar language, a language spoken in Papua New Guinea
- Karkar Rural LLG, a local-level government in Papua New Guinea
- Karkar Morghi Deli Bajak, a village in Iran
- Qarqarçay, a river in the Republic of Azerbaijan
- Muğanlı, Aghjabadi, a village in Azerbaijan also known as Karkar-Muganlysy
- Qarqar, a town in Syria
- Ras Karkar, a village in the West Bank
- Boubacar Traoré, a Malian musician
- Karkar (ancient city), a lost Mesopotamian city in modern Iraq

== See also ==
- Qarqar (disambiguation)
