= Julaki =

City in Khuzestan province, Iran

Julaki Persian: جولكي
- City
- Location within Iran
- Coordinates: 30°49′16″N 49°53′15″E
- Country: Iran
- Province: Khuzestan
- County: Aghajari
- District: Julaki

Population (2016)
  - Total: 1,525
- Time zone: UTC+3:30 (IRST)

Julaki (Persian: جولكي) (Note: Also romanized as Joulaki, Jūlakī, and Jūlekī) is a city in, and the capital of, Julaki District of Aghajari County, Khuzestan province, Iran. As a village, it was the capital of Julaki Rural District (Note: Renamed Sar Julaki Rural District) until its capital was transferred to the village of Sar Julaki.

== Demographics ==
=== Population ===
At the time of the 2006 National Census, Julaki's population was 1,440 in 306 households, when it was a village in Julaki Rural District of Jayezan District, Omidiyeh County. The following census in 2011 counted 1,459 people in 385 households. The 2016 census measured the population of the village as 1,525 people in 443 households, by which time the rural district had been separated from the county in the establishment of Aghajari County. The rural district was transferred to the new Julaki District and renamed Sar Julaki Rural District. It was the most populous village in its rural district.

After the census, Julaki was elevated to the status of a city.
