= Ashareh-ye Olya =

Ashareh-ye Olya عشاره عليا
- Village
- Location within Iran
- Coordinates: 30°38′55″N 49°47′09″E
- Country: Iran
- Province: Khuzestan
- County: Omidiyeh
- Bakhsh: Central
- Rural District: Chah Salem

Population (2006)
  - Total: 89
- Time zone: UTC+3:30 (IRST)
  - Summer (DST): UTC+4:30 (IRDT)

Ashareh-ye Olya (Persian: عشاره عليا, also Romanized as ‘Ashāreh-ye ‘Olyā and ‘Ashāreh ‘Olyā; also known as ‘Ashāreh-ye Bālā) is a village in Chah Salem Rural District, in the Central District of Omidiyeh County, Khuzestan Province, Iran. At the 2006 census, its population was 89, in 19 families.
