= Amir ol Mowmenin, Omidiyeh =

Amir ol Mowmenin اميرالمومنين
- Village
- Location within Iran
- Coordinates: 30°32′00″N 49°56′02″E
- Country: Iran
- Province: Khuzestan
- County: Omidiyeh
- Bakhsh: Central
- Rural District: Asiab

Population (2006)
  - Total: 831
- Time zone: UTC+3:30 (IRST)
  - Summer (DST): UTC+4:30 (IRDT)

Amir ol Mowmenin (Persian: اميرالمومنين, also Romanized as Amīr ol Mow’menīn and Amīr al Mūminīn; also known as Amīr Mow’menīn and Amīr ol Mo’menīn) is a village in Asiab Rural District, in the Central District of Omidiyeh County, Khuzestan Province, Iran. At the 2006 census, its population was 831, in 163 families.
