= Getrani =

Getrani گتراني
- Village
- Location within Iran
- Coordinates: 30°47′32″N 49°40′24″E
- Country: Iran
- Province: Khuzestan
- County: Omidiyeh
- Bakhsh: Central
- Rural District: Chah Salem

Population (2006)
  - Total: 37
- Time zone: UTC+3:30 (IRST)
  - Summer (DST): UTC+4:30 (IRDT)

Getrani (Persian: گتراني, also Romanized as Getrānī; also known as Qaţrānī) is a village in Chah Salem Rural District, in the Central District of Omidiyeh County, Khuzestan Province, Iran. At the 2006 census, its population was 37, in 6 families.
