= Kheyt-e Amareh =

Kheyt-e Amareh خيطعماره
- Village
- Location within Iran
- Coordinates: 30°42′33″N 49°43′35″E
- Country: Iran
- Province: Khuzestan
- County: Omidiyeh
- Bakhsh: Central
- Rural District: Chah Salem

Population (2006)
  - Total: 528
- Time zone: UTC+3:30 (IRST)
  - Summer (DST): UTC+4:30 (IRDT)

Kheyt-e Amareh (Persian: خيطعماره, also Romanized as Kheyţ-e ‘Amāreh and Kheyţ-e ‘Emāreh; also known as Kheyţ ol ‘Amāreh) is a village in Chah Salem Rural District, in the Central District of Omidiyeh County, Khuzestan Province, Iran. At the 2006 census, its population was 528, in 88 families.
