= Nomreh Yek-e Pain =

Nomreh Yek-e Pain نمره يك پائين
- Village
- Location within Iran
- Coordinates: 30°46′01″N 49°44′23″E
- Country: Iran
- Province: Khuzestan
- County: Omidiyeh
- Bakhsh: Central
- Rural District: Chah Salem

Population (2006)
  - Total: 1,043
- Time zone: UTC+3:30 (IRST)
  - Summer (DST): UTC+4:30 (IRDT)

Nomreh Yek-e Pain (Persian: نمره يك پائين, also Romanized as Nomreh Yek-e Pā’īn; also known as Āyatollāh Montaz̧erī, Āyatollāh Montaz̧erī-ye Pā’īn, and Nomreh Do) is a village in Chah Salem Rural District, in the Central District of Omidiyeh County, Khuzestan Province, Iran. At the 2006 census, its population was 1,043, in 234 families.
