= Shahrak-e Azadi, Omidiyeh =

Shahrak-e Azadi شهرك ازادي
- Village
- Location within Iran
- Coordinates: 30°56′15″N 49°49′35″E
- Country: Iran
- Province: Khuzestan
- County: Omidiyeh
- Bakhsh: Jayezan
- Rural District: Jayezan

Population (2006)
  - Total: 383
- Time zone: UTC+3:30 (IRST)
  - Summer (DST): UTC+4:30 (IRDT)

Shahrak-e Azadi (Persian: شهرك ازادي, also Romanized as Shahrak-e Āzādī) is a village in Jayezan Rural District, Jayezan District, Omidiyeh County, Khuzestan Province, Iran. At the 2006 census, its population was 383 in 87 families.
