= Asiab, Omidiyeh =

Village in Khuzestan province, Iran

Asiab Persian: آسياب
- Village
- Location within Iran
- Coordinates: 30°35′30″N 49°47′09″E
- Country: Iran
- Province: Khuzestan
- County: Omidiyeh
- District: Central
- Rural District: Asiab

Population (2016)
  - Total: 694
- Time zone: UTC+3:30 (IRST)

Asiab (Persian: اسياب) (Note: Also romanized as Āsīāb, Āsīyāb, and Asyāb) is a village in, and the capital of, Asiab Rural District of the Central District of Omidiyeh County, Khuzestan province, Iran.

== Demographics ==
=== Population ===
At the time of the 2006 National Census, the village's population was 780 in 170 households. The following census in 2011 counted 748 people in 210 households. The 2016 census measured the population of the village as 694 people in 191 households. It was the most populous village in its rural district.
