= Qaleh Hamud =

Qaleh Hamud قلعه حمود
- Village
- Location within Iran
- Coordinates: 30°51′44″N 49°51′21″E
- Country: Iran
- Province: Khuzestan
- County: Omidiyeh
- Bakhsh: Jayezan
- Rural District: Jayezan

Population (2006)
  - Total: 1,016
- Time zone: UTC+3:30 (IRST)
  - Summer (DST): UTC+4:30 (IRDT)

Qaleh Hamud (Persian: قلعه حمود, also Romanized as Qal‘eh Ḩamūd and Qal‘eh-ye Hamūd; also known as Kūt-e Ḩamīd, Kūt Hamud, Qal‘eh Ḩamīd, and Qal‘eh-ye Ḩamīd) is a village in Jayezan Rural District, Jayezan District, Omidiyeh County, Khuzestan Province, Iran. At the 2006 census, its population was 1,016, in 235 families.
