= Gargar-e Sofla =

Gargar-e Sofla or Gerger-e Sofla (Persian: گرگرسفلي) may refer to:

- Gargar-e Sofla, Khuzestan
- Gerger-e Sofla, Kurdistan

== See also ==
- Gerger, Iran (disambiguation)
