= Aghajari Airport =

- IATA: AKW; ICAO: OIAG

Summary
- Airport type: Public/Military
- Owner: Government of Iran
- Operator: Ministry of Petroleum (Iran); Islamic Revolutionary Guard Corps; Islamic Republic of Iran Air Force; Islamic Republic of Iran Air Defense Force
- Location: Omidiyeh, Iran
- Elevation AMSL: 52 ft / 16 m
- Coordinates: 30°44′40″N 049°40′37″E

Map
- Location of airport in Iran

Runways
| Direction | Length | | Surface |
| Direction | m | ft | Surface |
|---|---|---|---|
| 13/31 | 2,113 | 6,932 | Asphalt |

Aghajari Airport (IATA: AKW, ICAO: OIAG) is an airport serving Omidiyeh, a city in and the capital of Central District, in Omidiyeh County, Khuzestan Province, Iran.

== Facilities ==
The airport resides at an elevation of 88 feet (27 m) above mean sea level. It has one runway designated 13/31 with an asphalt surface measuring 2,113 by 45 metres (6,932 ft × 148 ft).

== Airlines and destinations ==
| Airlines | Destinations |
|---|---|
| Pars Air | Isfahan, Shiraz, Tehran–Mehrabad |
