= Miankuh, Khuzestan =

City in Khuzestan province, Iran

Miankuh Persian: میانکوه
- City
- Location within Iran
- Coordinates: 30°47′19″N 49°43′43″E
- Country: Iran
- Province: Khuzestan
- County: Omidiyeh
- District: Central
- Established as a municipality: 2019
- Time zone: UTC+3:30 (IRST)

Miankuh (Persian: میانکوه) is a city in the Central District of Omidiyeh County, Khuzestan province, Iran.

Established in 2019, Miankuh is five kilometers from the city of Omidiyeh and 125 kilometers from Ahvaz.
