= Gargari-ye Sofla =

Gargari-ye Sofla گرگري سفلي
- Village
- Location within Iran
- Coordinates: 30°34′43″N 49°50′27″E
- Country: Iran
- Province: Khuzestan
- County: Omidiyeh
- Bakhsh: Central
- Rural District: Asiab

Population (2006)
  - Total: 367
- Time zone: UTC+3:30 (IRST)
  - Summer (DST): UTC+4:30 (IRDT)

Gargari-ye Sofla (Persian: گرگري سفلي, also Romanized as Gargarī-ye Soflá and Gorgorī-ye Soflá; also known as Gargar-e Pā’īnī, Gargari Pāīni, Gargīrī-ye Pā’īn, and Gorgorī) is a village in Asiab Rural District, in the Central District of Omidiyeh County, Khuzestan Province, Iran. At the 2006 census, its population was 367, in 71 families.
