= Hammoud =

Hammoud or Hamoud or Hamud (in Arabic حمود) may refer to:

== Places ==
- Hamoud, a village in Al-Qasr, Karak Governorate, Jordan.
- Hamud, a village in Angali Rural District, in the Central District of Bushehr County, Bushehr Province, Iran
- Bourj Hammoud (or Burj Hammud), a suburb in North-East Beirut, Lebanon in the Metn district heavily populated by Lebanese Armenians
- Qaleh Hamud, a village in Jayezan Rural District, Jayezan District, Omidiyeh County, Khuzestan Province, Iran
- Sultan Hamud, town in Kasikeu division of Nzaui District of Eastern Province, Kenya

== People ==
=== Given name ===
- Hamoud Ameur (born 1932), French long-distance runner, Olympian
- Hamoud al Aqla al Shuebi (died 2001), Saudi Islamic cleric
- Hamoud Al-Dalhami (born 1971), Omani sprinter
- Hamoud al-Gayifi (1918–1985), Prime Minister of the Yemen Arab Republic serving 1964 to 1965 under President Abdullah as-Sallal
- Hamoud al-Hitar (born c. 1955), Yemeni judge
- Hamoud Jumaa (born 1970), Tanzanian politician, MP
- Hamoud Muhammed Ou'bad, Yemeni politician and government minister
- Hamoud Al-Saadi (born 1992), Omani football player
- Hamoud Al-Shemmari (born 1960), Kuwaiti football player

=== Middle name ===
- Ali bin Hamud of Zanzibar (1884–1918), Sultan of Zanzibar
- Saud Hamoud 'Abid al-Qatini al-'Otaibi (1971–2005), leader of Al-Qaeda in the Arabian Peninsula

=== Surname ===
- Abdullah Hammoud, Lebanese-American Mayor - City of Dearborn
- Ali Hammoud (born 1944), Syrian politician
- Assem Hammoud (born 1975), alleged Al Qaeda operative
- Fadwa Hammoud, American lawyer
- Mahmoud Hammoud (1935-2018), Lebanese politician and diplomat
- Mahmoud Hammoud (born 1964), Lebanese football player and manager
- Mohamad Hamoud (born 1987), Lebanese football player
- Mounir Hamoud (born 1985), Norwegian football player of Moroccan descent

== Other uses ==
- Hamoud Boualem, Algerian soft drink manufacturing company

== See also ==
- Hammouda, a name
