= Havilah (disambiguation) =

Havilah is a place in the Hebrew Bible.

Havilah may also refer to:

- Havilah (album), the Drones album
- Havilah, California, a US location
- Havilah, New South Wales, an Australian location
- Hoveyleh, an Iranian village
