= Qarqar (disambiguation) =

Qarqar or Karkar most commonly refers to Qarqar, an ancient city in Syria. They may also refer to:

- Qarqar, Azerbaijan, a village
- Karkar Island, Papua New Guinea
- Qarqarçay, a river in Azerbaijan
- Karkar, Selseleh, a village in Iran
- Boubacar Traoré, a Malian musician nicknamed "Kar Kar"

== See also ==
- Gargar (disambiguation)
- Korkor (disambiguation)
