= Qaleh Hamid =

Qaleh Hamid (Persian: حميد قلعه) may refer to:

- Qaleh Hamid, Khuzestan
- Qaleh Hamid, North Khorasan
