= Qarikənd =

- Location within Azerbaijan
- Coordinates: 40°34′N 45°47′E
- Country: Azerbaijan
- Rayon: Gadabay
- Municipality: Gərgər
- Time zone: UTC+4 (AZT)
  - Summer (DST): UTC+5 (AZT)

Qarikənd (also, Qarıkənd and Karykend) is a village in the Gadabay Rayon of Azerbaijan. The village forms part of the municipality of Gərgər.

== Time Zone ==
AZT (UTC+4)

Summer (DST) AZT (UTC+5)
