= Yenikənd, Gadabay =

Yenikənd
- Location within Azerbaijan
- Coordinates: 40°33′N 45°48′E
- Country: Azerbaijan
- Rayon: Gadabay
- Municipality: Gərgər
- Time zone: UTC+4 (AZT)
  - Summer (DST): UTC+5 (AZT)

Yenikənd (also, Yenikend) is a village in the Gadabay Rayon of Azerbaijan. The village forms part of the municipality of Gərgər.
