= Jayezan =

City in Khuzestan province, Iran

Jayezan Persian: جايزان
- City
- Location within Iran
- Coordinates: 30°52′30″N 49°51′17″E
- Country: Iran
- Province: Khuzestan
- County: Omidiyeh
- District: Jayezan

Population (2016)
  - Total: 2,357
- Time zone: UTC+3:30 (IRST)

Jayezan (Persian: جايزان) (Note: Also romanized as Jāīzān, Jāyezān, and Jāyzān) is a city in, and the capital of, Jayezan District of Omidiyeh County, Khuzestan province, Iran. It also serves as the administrative center for Jayezan Rural District.

== Demographics ==
=== Population ===
At the time of the 2006 National Census, the city's population was 1,953 in 460 households. The following census in 2011 counted 2,401 people in 607 households. The 2016 census measured the population of the city as 2,357 people in 660 households.
