= Hammouda =

Hammouda (in Arabic حمودة) or Hamouda or Hammuda is a given name derived of Hammoud and variants Hamoud and Hamud. It is also a common surname in Arabic. Notable people with the name include:

== Hammouda ==
- Adel Hammouda (born 1948), Egyptian journalist
- Hammouda Pacha Bey, (died 1666), second Bey of Tunis of the Mouradite dynasty reigning from 1631 until his death

== Hamouda ==
- Hamouda Ahmed El Bashir, Sudanese footballer
- Amirouche Aït Hamouda (1926-1959), commonly called Colonel Amirouche, a leader in the Algerian War, organizing the maquis of the Wilaya III and considered a national hero in Algeria
- Attia Hamouda (born 1914), Egyptian weightlifter
- Nabil Hamouda (born 1983), Algerian footballer
- Nassima Ben Hamouda (born 1973), Algerian volleyball player

== Hammuda ==
- Hammuda ibn Ali (1759–1814) leader of the Husainid Dynasty and the ruler of Tunisia from 1782 until his death
- Yahya Hammuda (1908-2006), Chairman of the Palestine Liberation Organization (PLO) Executive Committee from (1967-1969) following the resignation of Ahmad Shukeiri and a predecessor of chairman Yasser Arafat

== See also ==
- Hammouda Pacha Mosque, a mosque in Tunis, Tunisia
