= Gerger, Iran =

Gerger or Gar Gar (Persian: گرگر) in Iran may refer to:

- Gerger-e Olya
- Gerger-e Sofla, Kurdistan

== See also ==
- Gargar-e Sofla (disambiguation)
