= Aghajari Rural District =

Rural district in Khuzestan province, Iran

Aghajari Rural District Persian: دهستان آغاجاری
- Rural District
- Location within Iran
- Coordinates: 30°41′01″N 49°52′19″E
- Country: Iran
- Province: Khuzestan
- County: Aghajari
- District: Central

Population (2016)
  - Total: 7
- Time zone: UTC+3:30 (IRST)

Aghajari Rural District (Persian: دهستان آغاجاری) is in the Central District of Aghajari County, Khuzestan province, Iran.

== Demographics ==
=== Population ===
At the time of the 2006 National Census, the rural district's population (as a part of the former Aghajari District of Behbahan County) was below the reporting threshold. The population was again below the reporting threshold at the following census of 2011. The 2016 census measured the population of the rural district as seven in two households, by which time the district had been separated from the county in the establishment of Aghajari County. The rural district was transferred to the new Central District. Of its seven villages, none had populations above the reporting threshold.
