= Sarband-e Gaviad =

Sarband-e Gaviad سربندگوياد
- Village
- Country: Iran
- Province: South Khorasan
- County: Nehbandan
- Bakhsh: Shusef
- Rural District: Shusef

Population (2006)
  - Total: 88
- Time zone: UTC+3:30 (IRST)
  - Summer (DST): UTC+4:30 (IRDT)

Sarband-e Gaviad (Persian: سربندگوياد, also Romanized as Sarband-e Gavīād) is a village in Shusef Rural District, Shusef District, Nehbandan County, South Khorasan Province, Iran. At the 2006 census, its population was 88, spread among 25 families.
