= Sar Band, Jiroft =

Sar Band سربند
- Village
- Location within Iran
- Coordinates: 28°57′09″N 57°52′52″E
- Country: Iran
- Province: Kerman
- County: Jiroft
- Bakhsh: Jebalbarez
- Rural District: Maskun

Population (2006)
  - Total: 142
- Time zone: UTC+3:30 (IRST)
  - Summer (DST): UTC+4:30 (IRDT)

Sar Band (Persian: سربند, also Romanized as Sarband; also known as Sar Band-e Maskūn) is a village in Maskun Rural District, Jebalbarez District, Jiroft County, Kerman Province, Iran. At the 2006 census, its population was 142, in 32 families.
