= Amir ol Mowmenin, Bahmai =

Amir ol Mowmenin اميرالمومنين
- Village
- Location within Iran
- Coordinates: 30°59′51″N 50°12′33″E
- Country: Iran
- Province: Kohgiluyeh and Boyer-Ahmad
- County: Bahmai
- Bakhsh: Bahmai-ye Garmsiri
- Rural District: Sar Asiab-e Yusefi

Population (2006)
  - Total: 176
- Time zone: UTC+3:30 (IRST)
  - Summer (DST): UTC+4:30 (IRDT)

Amir ol Mowmenin (Persian: اميرالمومنين, also Romanized as Amīr ol Mow’menīn) is a village in Sar Asiab-e Yusefi Rural District, Bahmai-ye Garmsiri District, Bahmai County, Kohgiluyeh and Boyer-Ahmad Province, Iran. At the 2006 census, its population was 176, in 37 families.
