= Qatrani-ye Olya Yek =

Qatrani-ye Olya Yek قطراني عليايك
- Village
- Location within Iran
- Coordinates: 30°44′26″N 48°54′36″E
- Country: Iran
- Province: Khuzestan
- County: Shadegan
- Bakhsh: Central
- Rural District: Buzi

Population (2006)
  - Total: 44
- Time zone: UTC+3:30 (IRST)
  - Summer (DST): UTC+4:30 (IRDT)

Qatrani-ye Olya Yek (Persian: قطراني عليايك, also Romanized as Qaţrānī-ye ‘Olyā Yek; also known as Girāni and Qaţrānī) is a village in Buzi Rural District, in the Central District of Shadegan County, Khuzestan Province, Iran. At the 2006 census, its population was 44, in 6 families.
