= Ashareh-ye Bozorg =

Ashareh-ye Bozorg عشاره بزرگ
- Village
- Location within Iran
- Coordinates: 31°42′28″N 48°32′10″E
- Country: Iran
- Province: Khuzestan
- County: Ahvaz
- Bakhsh: Central
- Rural District: Elhayi

Population (2006)
  - Total: 353
- Time zone: UTC+3:30 (IRST)
  - Summer (DST): UTC+4:30 (IRDT)

Ashareh-ye Bozorg (Persian: عشاره بزرگ, also Romanized as ‘Ashāreh-ye Bozorg; also known as ‘Ashāreh) is a village in Elhayi Rural District, in the Central District of Ahvaz County, Khuzestan Province, Iran. At the 2006 census, its population was 353, in 58 families.
