= Kheyt, Mosharrahat =

Kheyt خيط
- Village
- Location within Iran
- Coordinates: 31°15′30″N 48°44′26″E
- Country: Iran
- Province: Khuzestan
- County: Ahvaz
- Bakhsh: Central
- Rural District: Mosharrahat

Population (2006)
  - Total: 281
- Time zone: UTC+3:30 (IRST)
  - Summer (DST): UTC+4:30 (IRDT)

Kheyt (Persian: خيط, also Romanized as Kheyţ) is a village in Mosharrahat Rural District, in the Central District of Ahvaz County, Khuzestan Province, Iran. At the 2006 census, its population was 281, in 55 families.
