= Qalandari, Hajjiabad =

Qalandari قلندري
- Village
- Location within Iran
- Coordinates: 27°55′07″N 56°44′05″E
- Country: Iran
- Province: Hormozgan
- County: Hajjiabad
- Bakhsh: Ahmadi
- Rural District: Ahmadi

Population (2006)
  - Total: 39
- Time zone: UTC+3:30 (IRST)
  - Summer (DST): UTC+4:30 (IRDT)

Qalandari (Persian: قلندري, also Romanized as Qalandarī) is a village in Ahmadi Rural District, Ahmadi District, Hajjiabad County, Hormozgan Province, Iran. At the 2006 census, its population was 39, in 6 families.
