= Sar Band-e Kasur =

Sar Band-e Kasur سربندكسور
- Village
- Country: Iran
- Province: Kerman
- County: Jiroft
- Bakhsh: Jebalbarez
- Rural District: Maskun

Population (2006)
  - Total: 107
- Time zone: UTC+3:30 (IRST)
  - Summer (DST): UTC+4:30 (IRDT)

Sar Band-e Kasur (Persian: سربندكسور, also Romanized as Sar Band-e Kasūr) is a village in Maskun Rural District, Jebalbarez District, Jiroft County, Kerman Province, Iran. At the 2006 census, its population was 107, in 25 families.
