= Amir ol Mowmenin, Andika =

Amir ol Mowmenin اميرالمومنين
- Village
- Location within Iran
- Coordinates: 32°02′42″N 49°28′12″E
- Country: Iran
- Province: Khuzestan
- County: Andika
- Bakhsh: Abezhdan
- Rural District: Abezhdan

Population (2006)
  - Total: 186
- Time zone: UTC+3:30 (IRST)
  - Summer (DST): UTC+4:30 (IRDT)

Amir ol Mowmenin (Persian: اميرالمومنين, also Romanized as Amīr ol Mow’menīn and Amīr ol Mo’menīn) is a village in Abezhdan Rural District, Abezhdan District, Andika County, Khuzestan Province, Iran. At the 2006 census, its population was 186, in 40 families.
