= Shahrak-e Azadi, Ramshir =

Shahrak-e Azadi شهرك ازادي
- Village
- Country: Iran
- Province: Khuzestan
- County: Ramshir
- Bakhsh: Central
- Rural District: Abdoliyeh-ye Sharqi

Population (2006)
  - Total: 40
- Time zone: UTC+3:30 (IRST)
  - Summer (DST): UTC+4:30 (IRDT)

Shahrak-e Azadi (Persian: شهرك ازادي, also Romanized as Shahrak-e Āzādī) is a village in Abdoliyeh-ye Sharqi Rural District, in the Central District of Ramshir County, Khuzestan Province, Iran. At the 2006 census, its population was 40, in 6 families.
