= Karkar Morghi Deli Bajak =

Karkar Morghi Deli Bajak كركرمرغي دلي بجك
- Village
- Country: Iran
- Province: Kohgiluyeh and Boyer-Ahmad
- County: Dana
- Bakhsh: Kabgian
- Rural District: Chenar

Population (2006)
  - Total: 18
- Time zone: UTC+3:30 (IRST)
  - Summer (DST): UTC+4:30 (IRDT)

Karkar Morghi Deli Bajak (Persian: كركرمرغي دلي بجك, also Romanized as Karkar Morghī Delī Bajak) is a village in Chenar Rural District, Kabgian District, Dana County, Kohgiluyeh and Boyer-Ahmad Province, Iran. At the 2006 census, its population was 18, in 4 families.
