= Qatrani-ye Sofla Yek =

Qatrani-ye Sofla Yek قطراني سفلي يك
- Village
- Location within Iran
- Coordinates: 30°44′26″N 48°54′36″E
- Country: Iran
- Province: Khuzestan
- County: Shadegan
- Bakhsh: Central
- Rural District: Buzi

Population (2006)
  - Total: 146
- Time zone: UTC+3:30 (IRST)
  - Summer (DST): UTC+4:30 (IRDT)

Qatrani-ye Sofla Yek (Persian: قطراني سفلي يك, also Romanized as Qaţrāni-ye Soflá Yek) is a village in Buzi Rural District, in the Central District of Shadegan County, Khuzestan Province, Iran. At the 2006 census, its population was 146, in 28 families.
