= Shahrak-e Azadi, Ahvaz =

Shahrak-e Azadi شهرك ازادي
- Village
- Country: Iran
- Province: Khuzestan
- County: Ahvaz
- Bakhsh: Hamidiyeh
- Rural District: Jahad

Population (2006)
  - Total: 100
- Time zone: UTC+3:30 (IRST)
  - Summer (DST): UTC+4:30 (IRDT)

Shahrak-e Azadi (Persian: شهرك ازادي, also Romanized as Shahraḵ-e Āzādī) is a village in Jahad Rural District, Hamidiyeh District, Ahvaz County, Khuzestan Province, Iran. At the 2006 census, its population was 100, in 14 families.
