= Sarband, Bandar Abbas =

Sarband سربند
- Village
- Location within Iran
- Coordinates: 27°30′26″N 56°01′05″E
- Country: Iran
- Province: Hormozgan
- County: Bandar Abbas
- Bakhsh: Fin
- Rural District: Fin

Population (2006)
  - Total: 73
- Time zone: UTC+3:30 (IRST)
  - Summer (DST): UTC+4:30 (IRDT)

Sarband (Persian: سربند) is a village in Fin Rural District, Fin District, Bandar Abbas County, Hormozgan Province, Iran. At the 2006 census, its population was 73, in 14 families.
