= Sarband-e Deh Di =

Sarband-e Deh Di سربندده دي
- Village
- Country: Iran
- Province: Khuzestan
- County: Lali
- Bakhsh: Hati
- Rural District: Hati

Population (2006)
  - Total: 60
- Time zone: UTC+3:30 (IRST)
  - Summer (DST): UTC+4:30 (IRDT)

Sarband-e Deh Di (Persian: سربندده دي, also Romanized as Sarband-e Deh Dī) is a village in Hati Rural District, Hati District, Lali County, Khuzestan Province, Iran. At the 2006 census, its population was 60, in 10 families.
