= Gerger-e Olya =

Gerger-e Olya گرگرعليا
- Village
- Location within Iran
- Coordinates: 35°00′53″N 47°17′52″E
- Country: Iran
- Province: Kurdistan
- County: Kamyaran
- Bakhsh: Muchesh
- Rural District: Amirabad

Population (2006)
  - Total: 546
- Time zone: UTC+3:30 (IRST)
  - Summer (DST): UTC+4:30 (IRDT)

Gerger-e Olya (Persian: گرگرعليا, also Romanized as Gerger-e ‘Olyā and Gar Gar-e ‘Olyā; also known as Gerger-e Bālā) is a village in Amirabad Rural District, Muchesh District, Kamyaran County, Kurdistan Province, Iran. At the 2006 census, its population was 546, in 115 families. The village is populated by Kurds.
