= Amir ol Mowmenin, Kohgiluyeh =

Amir ol Mowmenin اميرالمومنين
- Village
- Location within Iran
- Coordinates: 30°39′21″N 50°29′16″E
- Country: Iran
- Province: Kohgiluyeh and Boyer-Ahmad
- County: Kohgiluyeh
- Bakhsh: Central
- Rural District: Dehdasht-e Gharbi

Population (2006)
  - Total: 93
- Time zone: UTC+3:30 (IRST)
  - Summer (DST): UTC+4:30 (IRDT)

Amir ol Mowmenin (Persian: اميرالمومنين, also Romanized as Amīr ol Mowmenīn; also known as Emāmzādeh Amīralmomenīn) is a village in Dehdasht-e Gharbi Rural District, in the Central District of Kohgiluyeh County, Kohgiluyeh and Boyer-Ahmad Province, Iran. At the 2006 census, its population was 93, in 18 families.
