= Omidiyeh =

City in Khuzestan province, Iran

Omidiyeh Persian: اميديه
- City
- Location within Iran
- Coordinates: 30°45′30″N 49°42′18″E
- Country: Iran
- Province: Khuzestan
- County: Omidiyeh
- District: Central

Population (2016)
  - Total: 67,427
- Time zone: UTC+3:30 (IRST)
- Website: www.omidieh.com

Omidiyeh (Persian: اميديه) (Note: Also romanized as Omīdīyeh) is a city in the Central District of Omidiyeh County, Khuzestan province, Iran, serving as capital of both the county and the district.

== Demographics ==
=== Population ===
At the time of the 2006 National Census, the city's population was 57,970 in 12,123 households. The following census in 2011 counted 60,461 people in 15,456 households. The 2016 census measured the population of the city as 67,427 people in 18,574 households.

== Climate ==
Omidiyeh has a desert climate (Köppen climate classification BWh) with long, very hot summers and mild, short winters. Omidiyeh is consistently one of the hottest places on the planet during the summer, with summer temperatures regularly at least 45 degrees Celsius, sometimes exceeding 50 degrees Celsius with many sandstorms and dust storms common during the summer period. However, in winters, the minimum temperature can fall to around +5 degrees Celsius. The average annual rainfall is around 255 mm.

Climate data for Omidiyeh (Aghajari Airport) 1991-2020
Month	Jan	Feb	Mar	Apr	May	Jun	Jul	Aug	Sep	Oct	Nov	Dec	Year
Record high °C (°F)	28.8 (83.8)	32.6 (90.7)	39.8 (103.6)	45.4 (113.7)	51.0 (123.8)	51.4 (124.5)	52.6 (126.7)	52.2 (126.0)	49.5 (121.1)	44.6 (112.3)	36.8 (98.2)	31.0 (87.8)	52.6 (126.7)
Mean daily maximum °C (°F)	18.5 (65.3)	21.6 (70.9)	26.7 (80.1)	33.5 (92.3)	40.6 (105.1)	45.5 (113.9)	46.9 (116.4)	46.6 (115.9)	43.0 (109.4)	36.9 (98.4)	27.1 (80.8)	20.5 (68.9)	34.0 (93.2)
Daily mean °C (°F)	13.0 (55.4)	15.5 (59.9)	20.0 (68.0)	26.4 (79.5)	32.9 (91.2)	36.8 (98.2)	38.2 (100.8)	37.6 (99.7)	33.7 (92.7)	28.0 (82.4)	19.9 (67.8)	14.5 (58.1)	26.4 (79.5)
Mean daily minimum °C (°F)	7.8 (46.0)	9.6 (49.3)	13.1 (55.6)	18.8 (65.8)	24.0 (75.2)	26.4 (79.5)	28.7 (83.7)	28.2 (82.8)	24.0 (75.2)	19.3 (66.7)	13.3 (55.9)	9.1 (48.4)	18.5 (65.3)
Record low °C (°F)	−2.4 (27.7)	−2.0 (28.4)	3.4 (38.1)	6.4 (43.5)	16.0 (60.8)	20.4 (68.7)	22.6 (72.7)	22.0 (71.6)	16.0 (60.8)	7.2 (45.0)	−1.0 (30.2)	0.4 (32.7)	−2.4 (27.7)
Average precipitation mm (inches)	58.3 (2.30)	33.6 (1.32)	33.3 (1.31)	19.8 (0.78)	2.6 (0.10)	0.1 (0.00)	0.4 (0.02)	0.1 (0.00)	0.0 (0.0)	9.8 (0.39)	48.2 (1.90)	57.5 (2.26)	263.7 (10.38)
Average precipitation days (≥ 1.0 mm)	6.0	3.7	3.9	2.3	0.7	0.0	0.0	0.0	0.0	0.9	3.8	5.5	26.8
Average relative humidity (%)	71	59	48	37	25	20	23	28	29	34	52	70	41.3
Average dew point °C (°F)	5.2 (41.4)	4.5 (40.1)	4.9 (40.8)	6.6 (43.9)	6.4 (43.5)	5.5 (41.9)	8.8 (47.8)	11.0 (51.8)	8.5 (47.3)	6.9 (44.4)	6.6 (43.9)	6.5 (43.7)	6.8 (44.2)
Mean monthly sunshine hours	185	198	230	232	289	340	332	329	299	273	209	190	3,106
Source 1: NOAA NCEI
Source 2: Ogimet

Climate data for Omidiyeh (Paygah) (1983–2010)
Month	Jan	Feb	Mar	Apr	May	Jun	Jul	Aug	Sep	Oct	Nov	Dec	Year
Record high °C (°F)	27.8 (82.0)	33.5 (92.3)	39.0 (102.2)	44.0 (111.2)	50.8 (123.4)	51.5 (124.7)	53.0 (127.4)	52.0 (125.6)	50.1 (122.2)	45.6 (114.1)	37.5 (99.5)	31.0 (87.8)	53.0 (127.4)
Mean daily maximum °C (°F)	17.8 (64.0)	21.1 (70.0)	26.1 (79.0)	33.1 (91.6)	40.7 (105.3)	45.5 (113.9)	47.0 (116.6)	46.5 (115.7)	42.9 (109.2)	36.7 (98.1)	27.3 (81.1)	20.1 (68.2)	33.7 (92.7)
Daily mean °C (°F)	12.4 (54.3)	14.7 (58.5)	19.0 (66.2)	25.3 (77.5)	31.7 (89.1)	35.4 (95.7)	37.5 (99.5)	37.0 (98.6)	33.0 (91.4)	27.8 (82.0)	19.9 (67.8)	14.3 (57.7)	25.7 (78.3)
Mean daily minimum °C (°F)	7.0 (44.6)	8.3 (46.9)	11.9 (53.4)	17.5 (63.5)	22.8 (73.0)	25.4 (77.7)	27.9 (82.2)	27.5 (81.5)	23.2 (73.8)	18.8 (65.8)	12.6 (54.7)	8.5 (47.3)	17.6 (63.7)
Record low °C (°F)	−2.0 (28.4)	−3.5 (25.7)	0.4 (32.7)	6.5 (43.7)	13.6 (56.5)	18.6 (65.5)	21.4 (70.5)	20.0 (68.0)	16.2 (61.2)	7.0 (44.6)	0.0 (32.0)	−1.0 (30.2)	−3.5 (25.7)
Average precipitation mm (inches)	56.3 (2.22)	34.0 (1.34)	39.9 (1.57)	17.7 (0.70)	2.1 (0.08)	0.1 (0.00)	0.0 (0.0)	0.0 (0.0)	0.0 (0.0)	6.0 (0.24)	40.4 (1.59)	58.2 (2.29)	254.7 (10.03)
Average precipitation days (≥ 1.0 mm)	5.8	4.4	4.6	2.5	0.5	0.0	0.0	0.0	0.0	0.8	3.3	5.3	27.2
Average relative humidity (%)	78	68	58	48	35	31	32	38	39	45	60	76	50
Source: Iran Meteorological Organization (records), (temperatures), (precipitation), (humidity), (days with precipitation),
