= Aghajari =

City in Khuzestan province, Iran

Aghajari Persian: آغاجاری
- City
- Location within Iran
- Coordinates: 30°42′02″N 49°49′44″E
- Country: Iran
- Province: Khuzestan
- County: Aghajari
- District: Central

Population (2016)
  - Total: 11,912
- Time zone: UTC+3:30 (IRST)

Aghajari (Persian: آغاجاری) (Note: Also romanized as Āghā Jārī and Āghājārī; also known as Aghajari-e Zeydūn and Āqā Jarī) is a city in the Central District of Aghajari County, Khuzestan province, Iran, serving as capital of both the county and the district.

== Demographics ==
=== Language ===
The language of the people of Aghajari is the same as Masjid Suleiman and Lori Bakhtiari.

=== Population ===
Because of the Iran-Iraq War, the city's population dropped from 64,102 in 1986 to around 16,337 in the 1991 census and its population continued to drop long after the 1991 census (held 3 years after the end of the Iran-Iraq War).

At the time of the 2006 National Census, the city's population was 13,152 in 2,943 households, when it was in the former Aghajari District of Behbahan County The following census in 2011 counted 12,653 people in 3,400 households. The 2016 census measured the population of the city as 11,912 people in 3,477 households, by which time the district had been separated from the county in the establishment of Aghajari County.

== Climate ==
Aghajari has a hot desert climate (Köppen climate classification BWh) with long, scorching hot summers and pleasant to warm, short winters. Aghajari is consistently one of the hottest places on the planet during the summer, with summer temperatures regularly at least 45 °C or 113 °F, sometimes exceeding 50 °C or 122 °F with many sandstorms and duststorms. However, in winters, the minimum temperature can fall to around 5 °C or 41 °F. Winters in Aghajari have no snow. The average annual rainfall is around 260 millimetres or 10.2 inches.

Climate data for Aghajari (1984-2010)
Month	Jan	Feb	Mar	Apr	May	Jun	Jul	Aug	Sep	Oct	Nov	Dec	Year
Record high °C (°F)	28.0 (82.4)	32.6 (90.7)	38.4 (101.1)	44.0 (111.2)	49.6 (121.3)	51.4 (124.5)	51.6 (124.9)	52.0 (125.6)	49.0 (120.2)	43.6 (110.5)	37.0 (98.6)	30.2 (86.4)	52.0 (125.6)
Mean daily maximum °C (°F)	18.0 (64.4)	21.3 (70.3)	26.2 (79.2)	33.3 (91.9)	40.6 (105.1)	45.2 (113.4)	46.7 (116.1)	46.3 (115.3)	42.7 (108.9)	36.7 (98.1)	27.3 (81.1)	20.1 (68.2)	33.7 (92.7)
Daily mean °C (°F)	12.8 (55.0)	15.3 (59.5)	19.4 (66.9)	25.7 (78.3)	32.0 (89.6)	35.4 (95.7)	37.4 (99.3)	37.0 (98.6)	33.0 (91.4)	27.8 (82.0)	20.1 (68.2)	14.6 (58.3)	25.9 (78.6)
Mean daily minimum °C (°F)	7.6 (45.7)	9.2 (48.6)	12.6 (54.7)	18.2 (64.8)	23.3 (73.9)	25.6 (78.1)	28.0 (82.4)	27.6 (81.7)	23.1 (73.6)	18.8 (65.8)	13.0 (55.4)	9.0 (48.2)	18.0 (64.4)
Record low °C (°F)	−1.0 (30.2)	−2.0 (28.4)	0.0 (32.0)	7.0 (44.6)	13.5 (56.3)	19.0 (66.2)	20.5 (68.9)	20.0 (68.0)	12.0 (53.6)	5.3 (41.5)	−1.0 (30.2)	0.0 (32.0)	−2.0 (28.4)
Average rainfall mm (inches)	54.9 (2.16)	35.4 (1.39)	36.2 (1.43)	22.6 (0.89)	2.0 (0.08)	0.1 (0.00)	0.5 (0.02)	0.1 (0.00)	0.0 (0.0)	8.3 (0.33)	39.4 (1.55)	62.5 (2.46)	262 (10.31)
Average rainy days (≥ 1.0 mm)	6.1	3.5	4.4	2.5	0.5	0.0	0.1	0.0	0.0	0.8	3.3	6.0	27.2
Average relative humidity (%)	72	59	49	38	25	21	23	28	29	35	51	69	41
Mean monthly sunshine hours	179.3	195.9	225.5	232.5	289.2	337.1	326.6	327.5	297.8	274.8	213.6	184.1	3,083.9
Source: Iran Meteorological Organization (records), (temperatures), (precipitation), (humidity), (days with precipitation), (sunshine)
