= Gerger-e Sofla, Kurdistan =

Gerger-e Sofla گرگرسفلي
- Village
- Location within Iran
- Coordinates: 34°58′47″N 47°16′25″E
- Country: Iran
- Province: Kurdistan
- County: Kamyaran
- Bakhsh: Muchesh
- Rural District: Amirabad

Population (2006)
  - Total: 292
- Time zone: UTC+3:30 (IRST)
  - Summer (DST): UTC+4:30 (IRDT)

Gerger-e Sofla (Persian: گرگرسفلي, also Romanized as Gerger-e Soflá; also known as Gerger and Gerger-e Pā’īn) is a village in Amirabad Rural District, Muchesh District, Kamyaran County, Kurdistan Province, Iran. At the 2006 census, its population was 292, in 56 families. The village is populated by Kurds.
