= Ab Baran Rural District =

Rural district in Khuzestan province, Iran

Ab Baran Rural District Persian: دهستان آب باران
- Rural district
- Location within Iran
- Coordinates: 30°46′55″N 49°57′03″E
- Country: Iran
- Province: Khuzestan
- County: Aghajari
- District: Julaki
- Capital: Ab Baran-e Do

Population (2016)
  - Total: 2,117
- Time zone: UTC+3:30 (IRST)

Ab Baran Rural District (Persian: دهستان آب باران) is in Julaki District of Aghajari County, Khuzestan province, Iran. Its capital is the village of Ab Baran-e Do.

== History ==
After the 2011 National Census, Julaki Rural District (Note: Renamed Sar Julaki Rural District) was separated from Omidiyeh County, and Aghajari District from Behbahan County, in the establishment of Aghajari County. Ab Baran Rural District was established in the new Julaki District.

== Demographics ==
=== Population ===
At the time of the 2016 census, the rural district's population was 2,117 in 509 households. The most populous of its 10 villages was Ab Baran-e Do, with 1,420 people.
