= Gor Gor, Khuzestan =

Gor Gor گرگر
- Village
- Location within Iran
- Coordinates: 30°46′19″N 48°58′02″E
- Country: Iran
- Province: Khuzestan
- County: Mahshahr
- Bakhsh: Central
- Rural District: Jarahi

Population (2006)
  - Total: 2,333
- Time zone: UTC+3:30 (IRST)
  - Summer (DST): UTC+4:30 (IRDT)

Gor Gor (Persian: گرگر) is a village in Jarahi Rural District, in the Central District of Mahshahr County, Khuzestan Province, Iran. At the 2006 census, its population was 2,333, in 432 families.

The village has a railway station that is counted as a separate abadi in the Iranian census. According to the 2006 census, its population was 49, in 9 families.
