= Gərgər =

- Municipality
- Location within Azerbaijan
- Coordinates: 40°33′57″N 45°43′43″E
- Country: Azerbaijan
- Rayon: Gadabay

Population
  - Total: 2,201
- Time zone: UTC+4 (AZT)
  - Summer (DST): UTC+5 (AZT)

Gərgər (also, Gərkər, Gər-gər, and Gerger) is a village and municipality in the Gadabay Rayon of Azerbaijan. It has a population of 2,201. The municipality consists of the villages of Gərgər, Yenikənd, and Qarikənd.
