= Gargar-e Sofla, Khuzestan =

Gargar-e Sofla گرگرسفلي
- Village
- Location within Iran
- Coordinates: 30°46′32″N 48°58′19″E
- Country: Iran
- Province: Khuzestan
- County: Shadegan
- Bakhsh: Central
- Rural District: Hoseyni

Population (2006)
  - Total: 176
- Time zone: UTC+3:30 (IRST)
  - Summer (DST): UTC+4:30 (IRDT)

Gargar-e Sofla (Persian: گرگرسفلي, also Romanized as Gargar-e Soflá; also known as Gargar, Gazgaz, Gorgor, Gor Gor, and Gor Gor-e Pā’īn) is a village in Hoseyni Rural District, in the Central District of Shadegan County, Khuzestan Province, Iran. At the 2006 census, its population was 176, in 38 families.
