= Herher, Nagorno-Karabakh =

Herher / Gargar Հերհեր / Qarqar
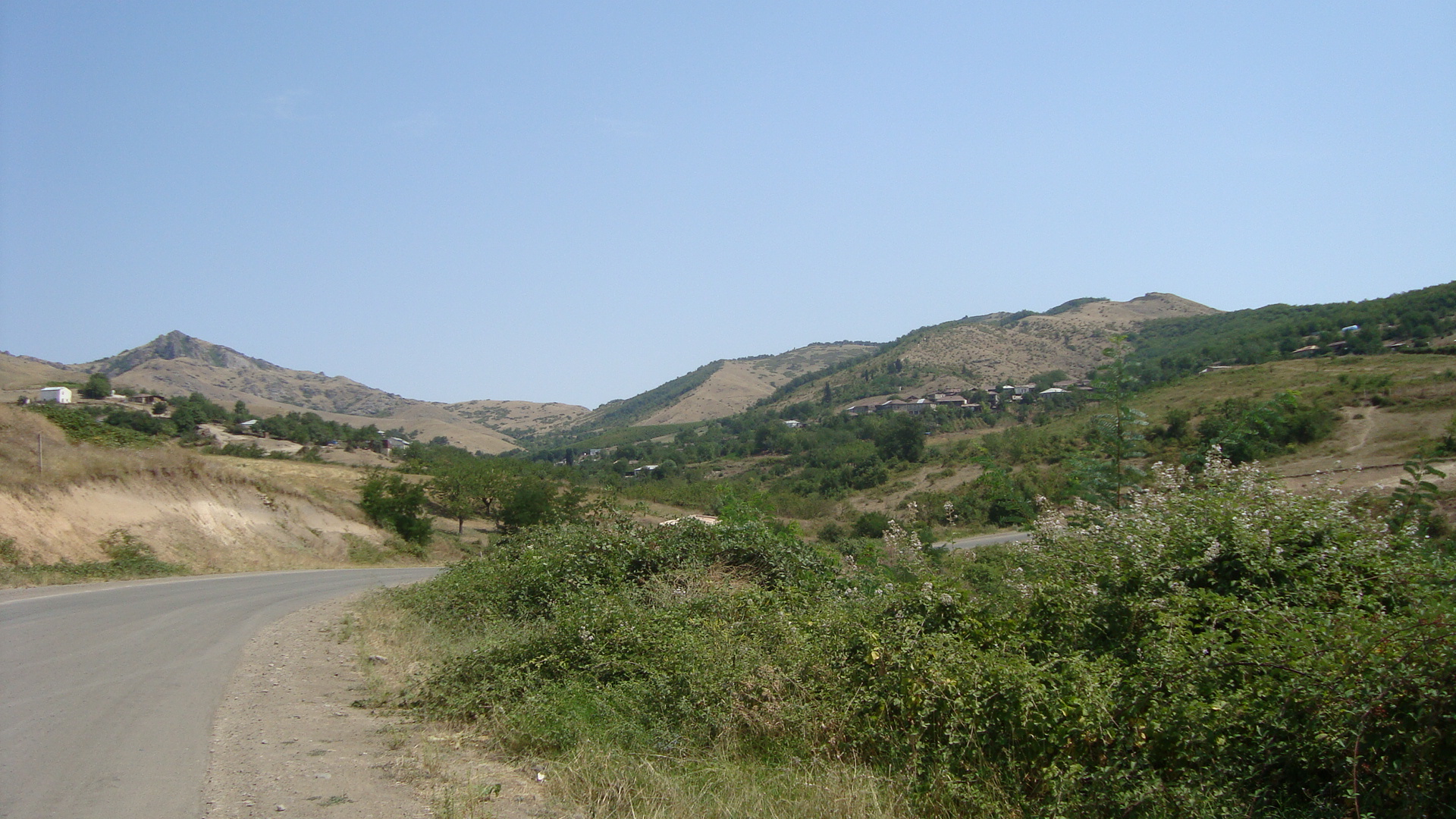

- Location within Azerbaijan Location within Karabakh Economic Region
- Coordinates: 39°42′11″N 46°57′49″E
- Country: Azerbaijan
  - District: Khojavend

Population (2015)
  - Total: 584
- Time zone: UTC+4 (AZT)

Herher (Armenian: Հերհեր) or Gargar (Azerbaijani: Qarqar) is a village in the Khojavend District of Azerbaijan, in the disputed region of Nagorno-Karabakh. Until 2023 it was controlled by the breakaway Republic of Artsakh. The village had an ethnic Armenian-majority population until the expulsion of the Armenian population of Nagorno-Karabakh by Azerbaijan following the 2023 Azerbaijani offensive in Nagorno-Karabakh.

== History ==
During the Soviet period, the village was a part of the Martuni District of the Nagorno-Karabakh Autonomous Oblast.

== Historical heritage sites ==
Historical heritage sites in and around the village include the St. Grigoris Church built between 1667 and 1676 by Bishop Barsegh of the Amaras Monastery, originally from the village of Gishi, as a summer residence for the monastery's monks. Also located near the village is the 17th-century St. Astvatsatsin Chapel, and a 17th/18th-century cemetery.

== Economy and culture ==
The population is mainly engaged in agriculture and animal husbandry. As of 2015, the village has a municipal building, a house of culture, a secondary school, two shops, and a medical centre.

== Demographics ==
The village had 577 inhabitants in 2005, and 584 inhabitants in 2015.

== Gallery ==
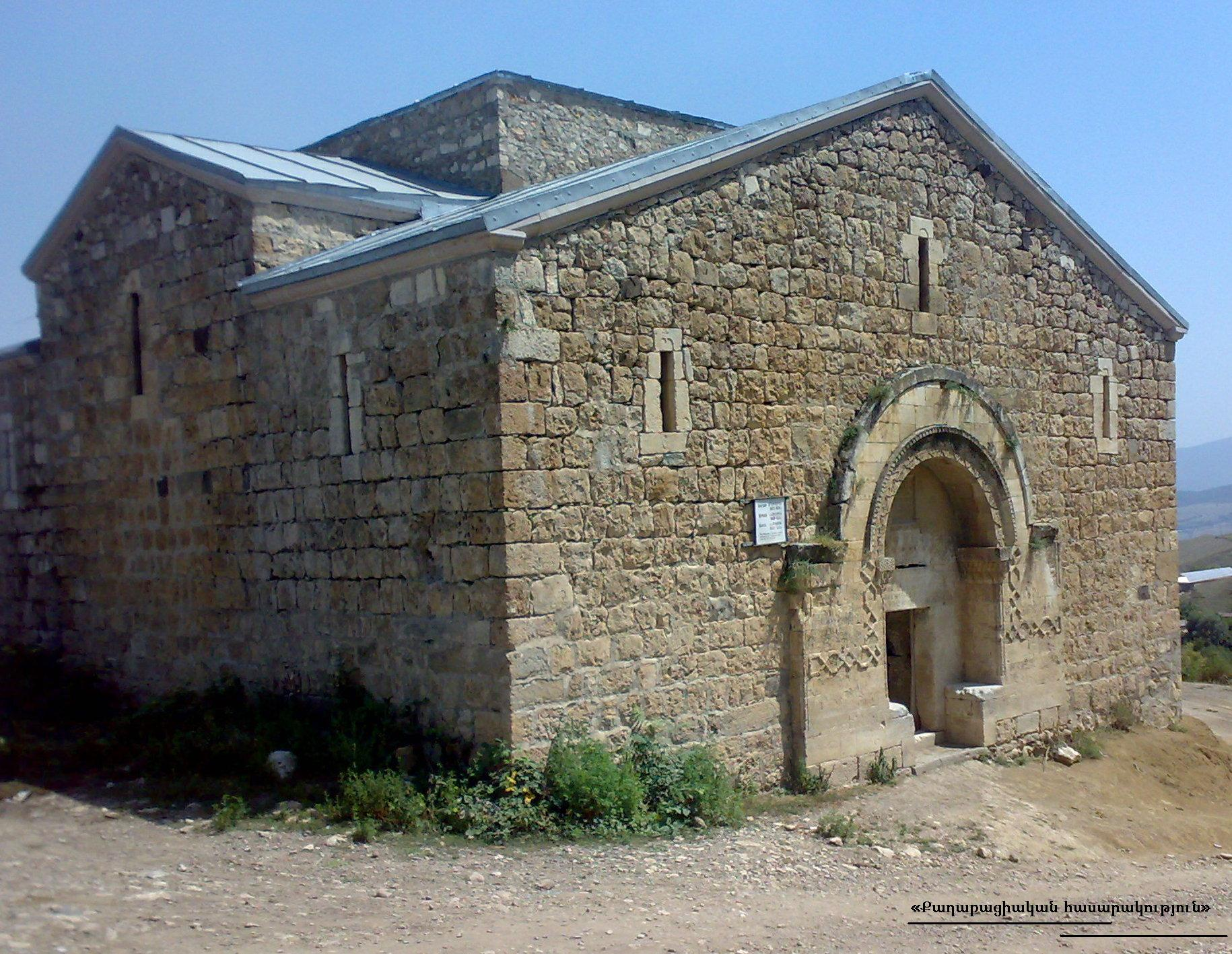
The 17th-century St. Grigoris Church in Herher
