= Julaki District =

District in Khuzestan province, Iran

Julaki District Persian: بخش جولکی
- District
- Location within Iran
- Coordinates: 30°47′01″N 49°55′50″E
- Country: Iran
- Province: Khuzestan
- County: Aghajari
- Capital: Julaki

Population (2016)
  - Total: 5,730
- Time zone: UTC+3:30 (IRST)

Julaki District (Persian: بخش جولکی) is in Aghajari County, Khuzestan province, Iran. Its capital is the city of Julaki.

== History ==
After the 2011 National Census, Julaki Rural District (Note: Renamed Sar Julaki Rural District) was separated from Omidiyeh County, and Aghajari District from Behbahan County, in the establishment of Aghajari County, which was divided into two districts of two rural districts each, with Aghajari as its capital and only city.

In August 2019, the village of Julaki was elevated to the status of a city.

== Demographics ==
=== Population ===
At the time of the 2016 census, the district's population was 5,730 inhabitants in 1,481 households.

=== Administrative divisions ===
Julaki District Population
Administrative Divisions	2016
Ab Baran RD	2,117
Sar Julaki RD (Note: Formerly Julaki Rural District)	3,613
Julaki (city) (Note: Became a city after the 2016 census)	
Total	5,730
RD = Rural District
