= Asiab Rural District =

Rural district in Khuzestan province, Iran

Asiab Rural District Persian: دهستان آسياب
- Rural District
- Location within Iran
- Coordinates: 30°32′54″N 49°53′27″E
- Country: Iran
- Province: Khuzestan
- County: Omidiyeh
- District: Central
- Capital: Asiab

Population (2016)
  - Total: 3,079
- Time zone: UTC+3:30 (IRST)

Asiab Rural District (Persian: دهستان آسياب) is in the Central District of Omidiyeh County, Khuzestan province, Iran. Its capital is the village of Asiab.

== Demographics ==
=== Population ===
At the time of the 2006 National Census, the rural district's population was 3,496 in 693 households. There were 3,270 inhabitants in 855 households at the following census of 2011. The 2016 census measured the population of the rural district as 3,079 in 851 households. The most populous of its 18 villages was Asiab, with 694 people.
