= Sar Julaki Rural District =

Rural district in Khuzestan province, Iran

Sar Julaki Rural District Persian: دهستان سرجولکی
- Rural district
- Location within Iran
- Coordinates: 30°49′10″N 49°53′32″E
- Country: Iran
- Province: Khuzestan
- County: Aghajari
- District: Julaki
- Capital: Sar Julaki

Population (2016)
  - Total: 3,613
- Time zone: UTC+3:30 (IRST)

Sar Julaki Rural District (Persian: دهستان سرجولکی) (Note: Formerly Julaki Rural District (دهستان جولکی)) is in Julaki District of Aghajari County, Khuzestan province, Iran. Its capital is the village of Sar Julaki. The previous capital of the rural district was the village of Julaki, now a city.

== Demographics ==
=== Population ===
At the time of the 2006 National Census, the rural district's population (as Julaki Rural District (Note: Renamed Sar Julaki Rural District) of Jayezan District, Omidiyeh County) was 7,932 in 1,521 households. There were 8,439 inhabitants in 1,990 households at the following census of 2011. The 2016 census measured the population of the rural district as 3,613 in 972 households, by which time it had been separated from the county in the establishment of Aghajari County. The rural district was transferred to the new Julaki District and renamed Sar Julaki Rural District. The most populous of its six villages was Julaki (now a city), with 1,525 people.
