= Aghajari County =

County in Khuzestan province, Iran

Aghajari County Persian: شهرستان آغاجاری
- County
- Location of Aghajari County in Khuzestan province (bottom right, yellow)

- Location of Khuzestan province in Iran
- Coordinates: 30°44′N 49°54′E
- Country: Iran
- Province: Khuzestan
- Capital: Aghajari
- Districts: Central, Julaki

Population (2016)
  - Total: 17,654
- Time zone: UTC+3:30 (IRST)

Aghajari County (Persian: شهرستان آغاجاری) is in Khuzestan province, Iran. Its capital is the city of Aghajari.

== History ==
After the 2011 National Census, Julaki Rural District (Note: Renamed Sar Julaki Rural District) was separated from Omidiyeh County, and Aghajari District from Behbahan County, in the establishment of Aghajari County, which was divided into two districts of two rural districts each, with Aghajari as its capital and only city.

In August 2019, the village of Julaki was elevated to the status of a city.

== Demographics ==
=== Population ===
At the time of the 2016 census, the county's population was 17,654 in 4,961 households.

=== Administrative divisions ===
Aghajari County's population and administrative structure are shown in the following table.

Aghajari County population
Administrative divisions	2016
Central District	11,919
Aghajari RD	7
Aghajari (city)	11,912
Julaki District	5,730
Ab Baran RD	2,117
Sar Julaki RD (Note: Formerly Julaki Rural District)	3,613
Julaki (city) (Note: Became a city after the 2016 census)	
Total	17,654
RD = rural district

== See also ==
Media related to Aghajari County at Wikimedia Commons
