= Jayezan Rural District =

Rural district in Khuzestan province, Iran

Jayezan Rural District Persian: دهستان جایزان
- Rural District
- Location within Iran
- Coordinates: 30°56′30″N 49°42′23″E
- Country: Iran
- Province: Khuzestan
- County: Omidiyeh
- District: Jayezan
- Capital: Jayezan

Population (2016)
  - Total: 8,360
- Time zone: UTC+3:30 (IRST)

Jayezan Rural District (Persian: دهستان جایزان) is in Jayezan District of Omidiyeh County, Khuzestan province, Iran. It is administered from the city of Jayezan.

== Demographics ==
=== Population ===
At the time of the 2006 National Census, the rural district's population was 5,273 in 1,129 households. There were 5,993 inhabitants in 1,437 households at the following census of 2011. The 2016 census measured the population of the rural district as 8,360 in 2,196 households. The most populous of its 43 villages was Eslamabad, with 1,881 people.
