= Jayezan District =

District in Khuzestan province, Iran

Jayezan District Persian: بخش جایزان
- District
- Location within Iran
- Coordinates: 30°56′30″N 49°42′23″E
- Country: Iran
- Province: Khuzestan
- County: Omidiyeh
- Capital: Jayezan

Population (2016)
  - Total: 10,717
- Time zone: UTC+3:30 (IRST)

Jayezan District (Persian: بخش جایزان) is in Omidiyeh County, Khuzestan province, Iran. Its capital is the city of Jayezan.

== History ==
After the 2011 National Census, Julaki Rural District was separated from the district to join Aghajari County.

== Demographics ==
=== Population ===
At the time of the 2006 census, the district's population was 15,158 in 3,110 households. The following census in 2011 counted 16,833 people in 4,034 households. The 2016 census measured the population of the district as 10,717 inhabitants in 2,856 households.

=== Administrative divisions ===
Jayezan District Population
Administrative Divisions	2006	2011	2016
Jayezan RD	5,273	5,993	8,360
Julaki RD (Note: Transferred to Aghajari County)	7,932	8,439	
Jayezan (city)	1,953	2,401	2,357
Total	15,158	16,833	10,717
RD = Rural District
