= Chah Salem Rural District =

Rural district in Khuzestan province, Iran

Chah Salem Rural District Persian: دهستان چاه سالم
- Rural District
- Location within Iran
- Coordinates: 30°43′10″N 49°34′40″E
- Country: Iran
- Province: Khuzestan
- County: Omidiyeh
- District: Central
- Capital: Chah Salem

Population (2016)
  - Total: 11,112
- Time zone: UTC+3:30 (IRST)

Chah Salem Rural District (Persian: دهستان چاه سالم) is in the Central District of Omidiyeh County, Khuzestan province, Iran. Its capital is the village of Chah Salem.

== Demographics ==
=== Population ===
At the time of the 2006 National Census, the rural district's population was 8,571 in 1,631 households. There were 9,856 inhabitants in 2,400 households at the following census of 2011. The 2016 census measured the population of the rural district as 11,112 in 2,842 households. The most populous of its 54 villages was Chah Salem, with 3,153 people.
