= Central District (Omidiyeh County) =

District in Khuzestan province, Iran

Central District (Omidiyeh County) Persian: بخش مرکزی شهرستان امیدیه
- District
- Location within Iran
- Coordinates: 30°40′03″N 49°42′09″E
- Country: Iran
- Province: Khuzestan
- County: Omidiyeh
- Capital: Omidiyeh

Population (2016)
  - Total: 81,618
- Time zone: UTC+3:30 (IRST)

The Central District of Omidiyeh County (Persian: بخش مرکزی شهرستان امیدیه) is in Khuzestan province, Iran. Its capital is the city of Omidiyeh.

== History ==
The village of Miankuh was elevated to the status of a city in 2019.

== Demographics ==
=== Population ===
At the time of the 2006 census, the district's population was 70,037 in 14,447 households. The following census in 2011 counted 73,587 people in 18,711 households. The 2016 census measured the population of the district as 81,618 inhabitants in 22,267 households.

=== Administrative divisions ===
Central District (Omidiyeh County) Population
Administrative Divisions	2006	2011	2016
Asiab RD	3,496	3,270	3,079
Chah Salem RD	8,571	9,856	11,112
Miankuh (city) (Note: Became a city after the 2016 census)			
Omidiyeh (city)	57,970	60,461	67,427
Total	70,037	73,587	81,618
RD = Rural District
