= Omidiyeh County =

County in Khuzestan province, Iran

Omidiyeh County Persian: شهرستان امیدیه
- County
- Location of Omidiyeh County in Khuzestan province (bottom right, purple)

- Location of Khuzestan province in Iran
- Coordinates: 30°47′N 49°42′E
- Country: Iran
- Province: Khuzestan
- Capital: Omidiyeh
- Districts: Central, Jayezan

Population (2016)
  - Total: 92,335
- Time zone: UTC+3:30 (IRST)

Omidiyeh County (Persian: شهرستان امیدیه) is in Khuzestan province, Iran. Its capital is the city of Omidiyeh.

== History ==
After the 2011 National Census, Julaki Rural District was separated from the county to join Aghajari County. The village of Miankuh was elevated to the status of a city in 2019.

== Demographics ==
=== Population ===
At the time of the 2006 census, the county's population was 85,195 in 17,557 households. The following census in 2011 counted 90,420 people in 22,723 households. The 2016 census measured the population of the county as 92,335 in 25,123 households.

=== Administrative divisions ===
Omidiyeh County's population history and administrative structure over three consecutive censuses are shown in the following table.

Omidiyeh County Population
Administrative Divisions	2006	2011	2016
Central District	70,037	73,587	81,618
Asiab RD	3,496	3,270	3,079
Chah Salem RD	8,571	9,856	11,112
Miankuh (city) (Note: Became a city after the 2016 census)			
Omidiyeh (city)	57,970	60,461	67,427
Jayezan District	15,158	16,833	10,717
Jayezan RD	5,273	5,993	8,360
Julaki RD (Note: Transferred to Aghajari County)	7,932	8,439	
Jayezan (city)	1,953	2,401	2,357
Total	85,195	90,420	92,335
RD = Rural District

== See also ==
Media related to Omidiyeh County at Wikimedia Commons
