= Darreh Bid =

Darreh Bid or Darreh-ye Bid or Darrehbid (Persian: دره‌بید) may refer to:

- Darreh Bid, Kiar, Chaharmahal and Bakhtiari Province
- Darreh Bid, Kuhrang, Chaharmahal and Bakhtiari Province
- Darreh Bid, Bazoft, Kuhrang County, Chaharmahal and Bakhtiari Province
- Darreh Bid, Faridan, Isfahan Province
- Darreh Bid, Tiran and Karvan, Isfahan Province
- Darreh Bid, Khuzestan
- Darreh Bid, Kohgiluyeh and Boyer-Ahmad
- Darreh Bid-e Deli Gerdu, Kohgiluyeh and Boyer-Ahmad Province
- Darreh Bid-e Jowkar, Kohgiluyeh and Boyer-Ahmad Province
- Darreh Bid-e Murzard, Kohgiluyeh and Boyer-Ahmad Province
- Darreh Bid, alternate name of Darreh Bidi Sefidar, Kohgiluyeh and Boyer-Ahmad Province
