= Puleh =

Village in Kohgiluyeh and Boyer-Ahmad province, Iran

Puleh Persian: پوله
- Village
- Location within Iran
- Coordinates: 31°16′50″N 50°48′42″E
- Country: Iran
- Province: Kohgiluyeh and Boyer-Ahmad
- County: Margown
- District: Zilayi
- Rural District: Shurum

Population (2016)
  - Total: 266
- Time zone: UTC+3:30 (IRST)

Puleh (Persian: پوله) (Note: Also romanized as Pūleh) is a village in, and the capital of, Shurum Rural District of Zilayi District, Margown County, Kohgiluyeh and Boyer-Ahmad province, Iran.

== Demographics ==
=== Population ===
At the time of the 2006 National Census, the village's population was 773 in 151 households, when it was in Zilayi Rural District of the former Margown District of Boyer-Ahmad County. The following census in 2011 counted 645 people in 152 households. The 2016 census measured the population of the village as 266 people in 60 households.

In 2018, the district was separated from the county in the establishment of Margown County, and the rural district was transferred to the new Zilayi District. Puleh was transferred to Shurum Rural District created in the district.
