= Jowkar, Kohgiluyeh and Boyer-Ahmad =

Village in Kohgiluyeh and Boyer-Ahmad province, Iran

Jowkar Persian: جوكار
- Village
- Location within Iran
- Coordinates: 31°06′22″N 50°53′45″E
- Country: Iran
- Province: Kohgiluyeh and Boyer-Ahmad
- County: Margown
- District: Central
- Rural District: Dalun

Population (2016)
  - Total: 332
- Time zone: UTC+3:30 (IRST)

Jowkar (Persian: جوكار) (Note: Also romanized as Javakār and Jowkār) is a village in, and the capital of, Dalun Rural District of the Central District of Margown County, Kohgiluyeh and Boyer-Ahmad province, Iran.

== Demographics ==
=== Population ===
At the time of the 2006 National Census, the village's population was 368 in 73 households, when it was in Margown Rural District of the former Margown District of Boyer-Ahmad County. The following census in 2011 counted 300 people in 60 households. The 2016 census measured the population of the village as 332 people in 76 households.

In 2018, the district was separated from the county in the establishment of Margown County, and the rural district was transferred to the new Central District. Jowkar was transferred to Dalun Rural District created in the district.
