= Mushemi (disambiguation) =

Mushemi is a village in Kohgiluyeh and Boyer-Ahmad Province, Iran.

Mushemi (Persian: موشمي) may also refer to:

- Mushemi, Margown
- Mushemi-ye Olya
- Mushemi-ye Sofla
- Mushemi-ye Vosta
