= Shahniz =

Village in Kohgiluyeh and Boyer-Ahmad province, Iran

Shahniz Persian: شهنيز
- Village
- Location within Iran
- Coordinates: 31°03′07″N 51°00′40″E
- Country: Iran
- Province: Kohgiluyeh and Boyer-Ahmad
- County: Margown
- District: Central
- Rural District: Margown

Population (2016)
  - Total: 781
- Time zone: UTC+3:30 (IRST)

Shahniz (Persian: شهنيز) (Note: Also romanized as Shahnīz) is a village in Margown Rural District of the Central District of Margown County, Kohgiluyeh and Boyer-Ahmad province, Iran.

== Demographics ==
=== Population ===
At the time of the 2006 National Census, the village's population was 737 in 158 households, when it was in the former Margown District of Boyer-Ahmad County. The following census in 2011 counted 886 people in 202 households. The 2016 census measured the population of the village as 781 people in 200 households. It was the most populous village in its rural district.

In 2018, the district was separated from the county in the establishment of Margown County, and the rural district was transferred to the new Central District.
