= Darbari, Iran =

Darbari (Persian: داربري) in Iran may refer to:

- Darbari-ye Dam-e Abbas
- Darbari-ye Jowkar
- Darbari-ye Mohammad Hoseyn Zilayi
