= Kimeh =

Kimeh (Persian: كيمه) may refer to:

- Kimeh, Khuzestan
- Kimeh-ye Olya, Kohgiluyeh and Boyer-Ahmad Province
- Kimeh-ye Sofla, Kohgiluyeh and Boyer-Ahmad Province
