= Talkhari =

Talkhari or Tall Khari (Persian: تل خاري) may refer to:

- Talkhari-ye Abbas-e Deligerdu
- Talkhari-ye Bandar-e Deligerdu
- Talkhari-ye Dam-e Deligerdu
