= Deli Rich-e Sofla =

Deli Rich-e Sofla دلي ريچ سفلي
- Village
- Country: Iran
- Province: Kohgiluyeh and Boyer-Ahmad
- County: Boyer-Ahmad
- Bakhsh: Margown
- Rural District: Margown

Population (2006)
  - Total: 302
- Time zone: UTC+3:30 (IRST)
  - Summer (DST): UTC+4:30 (IRDT)

Deli Rich-e Sofla (Persian: دلي ريچ سفلي, also Romanized as Delī Rīch-e Soflá) is a village in Margown Rural District, Margown District, Boyer-Ahmad County, Kohgiluyeh and Boyer-Ahmad Province, Iran. At the 2006 census, its population was 302, in 51 families.
