= Lah Meleh =

Lah Meleh (Persian: له مله) may refer to:

- Lah Meleh-ye Olya-ye Jowkar
- Lah Meleh-ye Sofla-ye Jowkar
