= Bard-e Pahn-e Zilayi =

Village in Kohgiluyeh and Boyer-Ahmad province, Iran

Bard-e Pahn-e Zilayi Persian: برد پهن زيلائي
- Village
- Location within Iran
- Coordinates: 31°23′34″N 50°39′38″E
- Country: Iran
- Province: Kohgiluyeh and Boyer-Ahmad
- County: Margown
- District: Zilayi
- Rural District: Zilayi

Population (2016)
  - Total: 1,059
- Time zone: UTC+3:30 (IRST)

Bard-e Pahn-e Zilayi (Persian: برد پهن زيلائي) (Note: Also romanized as Bard-e Pahn-e Zīlāyī; also known as Bard-e Pahn) is a village in Zilayi Rural District of Zilayi District, Margown County, Kohgiluyeh and Boyer-Ahmad province, Iran.

== Demographics ==
=== Population ===
At the time of the 2006 National Census, the village's population was 955 in 184 households, when it was in the former Margown District of Boyer-Ahmad County. The following census in 2011 counted 1,172 people in 268 households. The 2016 census measured the population of the village as 1,059 people in 261 households. It was the most populous village in its rural district.

In 2018, the district was separated from the county in the establishment of Margown County, and the rural district was transferred to the new Zilayi District.
