= Delitangu-ye Sofla =

Delitangu-ye Sofla دلي تنگوسفلي
- Village
- Location within Iran
- Coordinates: 31°05′50″N 50°56′18″E
- Country: Iran
- Province: Kohgiluyeh and Boyer-Ahmad
- County: Boyer-Ahmad
- Bakhsh: Margown
- Rural District: Margown

Population (2006)
  - Total: 149
- Time zone: UTC+3:30 (IRST)
  - Summer (DST): UTC+4:30 (IRDT)

Delitangu-ye Sofla (Persian: دلي تنگوسفلي, also Romanized as Delītangū-ye Soflá; also known as Delītangū) is a village in Margown Rural District, Margown District, Boyer-Ahmad County, Kohgiluyeh and Boyer-Ahmad Province, Iran. At the 2006 census, its population was 149, in 29 families.
