= Chahar Murun =

Chahar Murun (Persian: چهارمورون) may refer to:

- Chahar Murun-e Jowkar
- Chahar Murun-e Tamdari
