= Cheshmeh Goli-ye Shahniz =

Cheshmeh Goli-ye Shahniz چشمه گلي شهنيز
- Village
- Location within Iran
- Coordinates: 31°04′24″N 50°57′41″E
- Country: Iran
- Province: Kohgiluyeh and Boyer-Ahmad
- County: Boyer-Ahmad
- Bakhsh: Margown
- Rural District: Margown

Population (2006)
  - Total: 96
- Time zone: UTC+3:30 (IRST)
  - Summer (DST): UTC+4:30 (IRDT)

Cheshmeh Goli-ye Shahniz (Persian: چشمه گلي شهنيز, also Romanized as Cheshmeh Golī-ye Shahnīz; also known as Cheshmeh Golī) is a village in Margown Rural District, Margown District, Boyer-Ahmad County, Kohgiluyeh and Boyer-Ahmad Province, Iran. At the 2006 census, its population was 96, in 15 families.
