= Deh Boniab-e Charbiyun =

Deh Boniab-e Charbiyun ده بنياب چربيون
- Village
- Country: Iran
- Province: Kohgiluyeh and Boyer-Ahmad
- County: Boyer-Ahmad
- Bakhsh: Margown
- Rural District: Zilayi

Population (2006)
  - Total: 17
- Time zone: UTC+3:30 (IRST)
  - Summer (DST): UTC+4:30 (IRDT)

Deh Boniab-e Charbiyun (Persian: ده بنياب چربيون, also Romanized as Deh Bonīāb-e Charbīyūn) is a village in Zilayi Rural District, Margown District, Boyer-Ahmad County, Kohgiluyeh and Boyer-Ahmad Province, Iran. At the 2006 census, its population was 17, in 4 families.
