= Khorram Rah =

Khorram Rah خرم راه
- Village
- Location within Iran
- Coordinates: 31°21′24″N 50°36′31″E
- Country: Iran
- Province: Kohgiluyeh and Boyer-Ahmad
- County: Boyer-Ahmad
- Bakhsh: Margown
- Rural District: Zilayi

Population (2006)
  - Total: 369
- Time zone: UTC+3:30 (IRST)
  - Summer (DST): UTC+4:30 (IRDT)

Khorram Rah (Persian: خرم راه, also Romanized as Khorram Rāh) is a village in Zilayi Rural District, Margown District, Boyer-Ahmad County, Kohgiluyeh and Boyer-Ahmad Province, Iran. At the 2006 census, its population was 369, in 64 families.
