= Dowband =

Dowband (Persian: دوبند) may refer to:

- Dowband-e Cheshmeh Puti
- Dowband-e Shahniz
