= Deh Neseh-e Deli Gerdu-ye Sofla =

Village in Kohgiluyeh and Boyer-Ahmad, Iran

Deh Neseh-e Deli Gerdu-ye Sofla ده نسه دلي گردوسفلي
- Village
- Location within Iran
- Coordinates: 31°06′00″N 50°58′51″E
- Country: Iran
- Province: Kohgiluyeh and Boyer-Ahmad
- County: Boyer-Ahmad
- Bakhsh: Margown
- Rural District: Margown

Population (2006)
  - Total: 120
- Time zone: UTC+3:30 (IRST)
  - Summer (DST): UTC+4:30 (IRDT)

Deh Neseh-e Deli Gerdu-ye Sofla (Persian: ده نسه دلي گردوسفلي, also Romanized as Deh Neseh-e Delī Gerdū-ye Soflá; also known as Deh Neseh-e Delī Gerdū) is a village in Margown Rural District, Margown District, Boyer-Ahmad County, Kohgiluyeh and Boyer-Ahmad Province, Iran. At the 2006 census, its population was 120, in 22 families.
