= Qaleh-ye Bani-ye Mushemi =

Qaleh-ye Bani-ye Mushemi قلعه بني موشمي
- Village
- Location within Iran
- Coordinates: 31°21′54″N 50°41′02″E
- Country: Iran
- Province: Kohgiluyeh and Boyer-Ahmad
- County: Boyer-Ahmad
- Bakhsh: Margown
- Rural District: Zilayi

Population (2006)
  - Total: 323
- Time zone: UTC+3:30 (IRST)
  - Summer (DST): UTC+4:30 (IRDT)

Qaleh-ye Bani-ye Mushemi (Persian: قلعه بني موشمي, also Romanized as Qal‘eh-ye Banī-ye Mūshemī; also known as Qal‘eh-ye Banī) is a village in Zilayi Rural District, Margown District, Boyer-Ahmad County, Kohgiluyeh and Boyer-Ahmad Province, Iran. At the 2006 census, its population was 323, in 52 families.
