= Qaleh-e Saqaveh =

Qaleh-e Saqaveh قلعه سقاوه
- Village
- Location within Iran
- Coordinates: 30°57′39″N 51°06′29″E
- Country: Iran
- Province: Kohgiluyeh and Boyer-Ahmad
- County: Boyer-Ahmad
- Bakhsh: Margown
- Rural District: Margown

Population (2006)
  - Total: 94
- Time zone: UTC+3:30 (IRST)
  - Summer (DST): UTC+4:30 (IRDT)

Qaleh-e Saqaveh (Persian: قلعه سقاوه, also romanized as Qal‘eh-e Saqāveh) is a village in Margown Rural District, Margown District, Boyer-Ahmad County, Kohgiluyeh and Boyer-Ahmad Province, Iran. At the 2006 census, its population was 94, in 19 families.
