= Darreh Seheh =

Darreh Seheh دره صحه
- Village
- Location within Iran
- Coordinates: 31°17′57″N 50°46′11″E
- Country: Iran
- Province: Kohgiluyeh and Boyer-Ahmad
- County: Boyer-Ahmad
- Bakhsh: Margown
- Rural District: Zilayi

Population (2006)
  - Total: 210
- Time zone: UTC+3:30 (IRST)
  - Summer (DST): UTC+4:30 (IRDT)

Darreh Seheh (Persian: دره صحه, romanized: Darreh Şeḩeh) is a village in Zilayi Rural District, Margown District, Boyer-Ahmad County, Kohgiluyeh and Boyer-Ahmad Province, Iran. At the 2006 census, its population was 210, across 42 families.
