= Bard-e Gapi-ye Charbiyun =

Bard-e Gapi-ye Charbiyun بردگپي چربيون
- Village
- Location within Iran
- Coordinates: 31°12′21″N 50°45′00″E
- Country: Iran
- Province: Kohgiluyeh and Boyer-Ahmad
- County: Boyer-Ahmad
- Bakhsh: Margown
- Rural District: Zilayi

Population (2006)
  - Total: 34
- Time zone: UTC+3:30 (IRST)
  - Summer (DST): UTC+4:30 (IRDT)

Bard-e Gapi-ye Charbiyun (Persian: بردگپي چربيون, also Romanized as Bard-e Gapī-ye Charbīyūn; also known as Bard-e Gapī-ye Chirbīyūn) is a village in Zilayi Rural District, Margown District, Boyer-Ahmad County, Kohgiluyeh and Boyer-Ahmad Province, Iran. At the 2006 census, its population was 34, in 6 families.
