= Chahar Tall-e Mir Mohammad Fasiyeh =

Chahar Tall-e Mir Mohammad Fasiyeh چهارتل ميرمحمدفصيح
- Village
- Location within Iran
- Coordinates: 31°16′46″N 50°43′52″E
- Country: Iran
- Province: Kohgiluyeh and Boyer-Ahmad
- County: Boyer-Ahmad
- Bakhsh: Margown
- Rural District: Zilayi

Population (2006)
  - Total: 35
- Time zone: UTC+3:30 (IRST)
  - Summer (DST): UTC+4:30 (IRDT)

Chahar Tall-e Mir Mohammad Fasiyeh (Persian: چهارتل ميرمحمدفصيح, also Romanized as Chahār Tall-e Mīr Moḩammad Faṣīyeḥ; also known as Chahār Tall) is a village in Zilayi Rural District, Margown District, Boyer-Ahmad County, Kohgiluyeh and Boyer-Ahmad Province, Iran. At the 2006 census, its population was 35, in 9 families.
