= Gowd-e Talkhdan-e Zilayi =

Gowd-e Talkhdan-e Zilayi گودتلخدان زيلائي
- Village
- Country: Iran
- Province: Kohgiluyeh and Boyer-Ahmad
- County: Boyer-Ahmad
- Bakhsh: Margown
- Rural District: Zilayi

Population (2006)
  - Total: 231
- Time zone: UTC+3:30 (IRST)
  - Summer (DST): UTC+4:30 (IRDT)

Gowd-e Talkhdan-e Zilayi (Persian: گودتلخدان زيلائي, also Romanized as Gowd-e Talkhdān-e Zīlāyī) is a village in Zilayi Rural District, Margown District, Boyer-Ahmad County, Kohgiluyeh and Boyer-Ahmad Province, Iran. At the 2006 census, its population was 231, in 43 families.
