= Qaba Sukhteh =

Village in Kohgiluyeh and Boyer-Ahmad, Iran

Qaba Sukhteh قباسوخته
- Village
- Location within Iran
- Coordinates: 31°25′13″N 50°33′02″E
- Country: Iran
- Province: Kohgiluyeh and Boyer-Ahmad
- County: Boyer-Ahmad
- Bakhsh: Margown
- Rural District: Zilayi

Population (2006)
  - Total: 31
- Time zone: UTC+3:30 (IRST)
  - Summer (DST): UTC+4:30 (IRDT)

Qaba Sukhteh (Persian: قباسوخته, also Romanized as Qabā Sūkhteh) is a village in Zilayi Rural District, Margown District, Boyer-Ahmad County, Kohgiluyeh and Boyer-Ahmad Province, Iran. At the 2006 census, its population was 31, in 5 families.
