= Deli Gerdu-ye Olya =

Village in Kohgiluyeh and Boyer-Ahmad, Iran

Deli Gerdu-ye Olya دلی گردو علیا
- Village
- Location within Iran
- Coordinates: 31°07′21″N 50°59′02″E
- Country: Iran
- Province: Kohgiluyeh and Boyer-Ahmad
- County: Boyer-Ahmad
- Bakhsh: Margown
- Rural District: Margown

Population (2006)
  - Total: 103
- Time zone: UTC+3:30 (IRST)
  - Summer (DST): UTC+4:30 (IRDT)

Deli Gerdu-ye Olya (Persian: دلی گردو علیا) (Note: Romanised as either Delī Gerdū-ye 'Olyā or as Delī Gerdū) is a village in Margown Rural District, Margown District, Boyer-Ahmad County, Kohgiluyeh and Boyer-Ahmad Province, Iran. At the 2006 census, its population was 103, in 18 families.
