= Sargari Kalagh Khvordeh =

Sargari Kalagh Khvordeh سرگري كلاغ خورده
- Village
- Country: Iran
- Province: Kohgiluyeh and Boyer-Ahmad
- County: Boyer-Ahmad
- Bakhsh: Margown
- Rural District: Zilayi

Population (2006)
  - Total: 22
- Time zone: UTC+3:30 (IRST)
  - Summer (DST): UTC+4:30 (IRDT)

Sargari Kalagh Khvordeh (Persian: سرگري كلاغ خورده, also Romanized as Sargarī Kalāgh Khvordeh) is a village in Zilayi Rural District, Margown District, Boyer-Ahmad County, Kohgiluyeh and Boyer-Ahmad Province, Iran. According to the 2006 census, it had a population of 22, in 4 families.
