= Boneh Deraz-e Mushemi =

Boneh Deraz-e Mushemi بنه درازموشمي
- Village
- Country: Iran
- Province: Kohgiluyeh and Boyer-Ahmad
- County: Boyer-Ahmad
- Bakhsh: Margown
- Rural District: Zilayi

Population (2006)
  - Total: 101
- Time zone: UTC+3:30 (IRST)
  - Summer (DST): UTC+4:30 (IRDT)

Boneh Deraz-e Mushemi (Persian: بنه درازموشمي, also romanized as Boneh Derāz-e Mūshemī) is a village in Zilayi Rural District, Margown District, Boyer-Ahmad County, Kohgiluyeh and Boyer-Ahmad Province, Iran. At the 2006 census its population was 101, in 21 families.
