= Naseh Gowd =

Naseh Gowd (Persian: نسه گود) may refer to:

- Naseh Gowd-e Harmun-e Jowkar
- Naseh Gowd-e Vali Khan-e Jowkar
