= Naseh-ye Mur-e Gham =

Village in Kohgiluyeh and Boyer-Ahmad, Iran

Naseh-ye Mur-e Gham نسه مورغم
- Village
- Location within Iran
- Coordinates: 31°15′49″N 50°26′28″E
- Country: Iran
- Province: Kohgiluyeh and Boyer-Ahmad
- County: Boyer-Ahmad
- Bakhsh: Margown
- Rural District: Zilayi

Population (2006)
  - Total: 165
- Time zone: UTC+3:30 (IRST)
  - Summer (DST): UTC+4:30 (IRDT)

Naseh-ye Mur-e Gham (Persian: نسه مورغم, also Romanized as Naseh-ye Mūr-e Gham; also known as Naseh) is a village in Zilayi Rural District, Margown District, Boyer-Ahmad County, Kohgiluyeh and Boyer-Ahmad Province, Iran. At the 2006 census, its population was 165, in 33 families.
