= Meleh Khvoish-e Sofla =

Meleh Khvoish-e Sofla مله خويش سفلي
- Village
- Country: Iran
- Province: Kohgiluyeh and Boyer-Ahmad
- County: Boyer-Ahmad
- Bakhsh: Margown
- Rural District: Zilayi

Population (2006)
  - Total: 29
- Time zone: UTC+3:30 (IRST)
  - Summer (DST): UTC+4:30 (IRDT)

Meleh Khvoish-e Sofla (Persian: مله خويش سفلي, also Romanized as Meleh Khvoīsh=e Soflá) is a village in Zilayi Rural District, Margown District, Boyer-Ahmad County, Kohgiluyeh and Boyer-Ahmad Province, Iran. At the 2006 census, its population was 29, in 7 families.
