= Mur-e Gham-e Vosta =

Mur-e Gham-e Vosta مورغم وسطي
- Village
- Location within Iran
- Coordinates: 31°25′13″N 50°35′32″E
- Country: Iran
- Province: Kohgiluyeh and Boyer-Ahmad
- County: Boyer-Ahmad
- Bakhsh: Margown
- Rural District: Zilayi

Population (2006)
  - Total: 111
- Time zone: UTC+3:30 (IRST)
  - Summer (DST): UTC+4:30 (IRDT)

Mur-e Gham-e Vosta (Persian: مورغم وسطي, also Romanized as Mūr-e Gham-e Vosţá; also known as Mūr-e Gham) is a village in Zilayi Rural District, Margown District, Boyer-Ahmad County, Kohgiluyeh and Boyer-Ahmad Province, Iran. At the 2006 census, its population was 111, in 25 families.
