= Cheshmeh-ye Lashehi-ye Jowkar =

Village in Kohgiluyeh and Boyer-Ahmad, Iran

Cheshmeh-ye Lashehi-ye Jowkar چشمه لشه اي جوكار
- Village
- Country: Iran
- Province: Kohgiluyeh and Boyer-Ahmad
- County: Boyer-Ahmad
- Bakhsh: Margown
- Rural District: Margown

Population (2006)
  - Total: 104
- Time zone: UTC+3:30 (IRST)
  - Summer (DST): UTC+4:30 (IRDT)

Cheshmeh-ye Lashehi-ye Jowkar (Persian: چشمه لشه اي جوكار, also romanized as Cheshmeh-ye Lashehī-ye Jowkār) is a village in Margown Rural District, Margown District, Boyer-Ahmad County, Kohgiluyeh and Boyer-Ahmad Province, Iran. At the 2006 census, its population was 104, in 16 families.
