= Bard Kolang-e Olya Chahar Tall =

Bard Kolang-e Olya Chahar Tall بردكلنگ علياچهارتل
- Village
- Location within Iran
- Coordinates: 31°17′18″N 50°43′36″E
- Country: Iran
- Province: Kohgiluyeh and Boyer-Ahmad
- County: Boyer-Ahmad
- Bakhsh: Margown
- Rural District: Zilayi

Population (2006)
  - Total: 64
- Time zone: UTC+3:30 (IRST)
  - Summer (DST): UTC+4:30 (IRDT)

Bard Kolang-e Olya Chahar Tall (Persian: بردكلنگ علياچهارتل, also Romanized as Bard Kolang-e ‘Olyā Chahār Tall; also known as Bard Kolang) is a village in Zilayi Rural District, Margown District, Boyer-Ahmad County, Kohgiluyeh and Boyer-Ahmad Province, Iran. At the 2006 census, its population was 64, in 12 families.
