= Kuland-e Zilayi =

Kuland-e Zilayi كولندزيلايي
- Village
- Location within Iran
- Coordinates: 31°21′01″N 50°38′56″E
- Country: Iran
- Province: Kohgiluyeh and Boyer-Ahmad
- County: Boyer-Ahmad
- Bakhsh: Margown
- Rural District: Zilayi

Population (2006)
  - Total: 73
- Time zone: UTC+3:30 (IRST)
  - Summer (DST): UTC+4:30 (IRDT)

Kuland-e Zilayi (Persian: كولندزيلايي, also Romanized as Kūland-e Zīlāyī; also known as Kūland) is a village in Zilayi Rural District, Margown District, Boyer-Ahmad County, Kohgiluyeh and Boyer-Ahmad Province, Iran. At the 2006 census, its population was 73, in 15 families.
