= Taleh Zar =

Taleh Zar (Persian: طلعه زار) may refer to:

- Taleh Zar-e Olya
- Taleh Zar-e Sofla
