= Kolgeh Deli Rich-e Olya =

Kolgeh Deli Rich-e Olya كلگه دلي ريچ عليا
- Village
- Country: Iran
- Province: Kohgiluyeh and Boyer-Ahmad
- County: Boyer-Ahmad
- Bakhsh: Margown
- Rural District: Margown

Population (2006)
  - Total: 28
- Time zone: UTC+3:30 (IRST)
  - Summer (DST): UTC+4:30 (IRDT)

Kolgeh Deli Rich-e Olya (Persian: كلگه دلي ريچ عليا, also Romanized as Kolgeh Delī Rīch-e ‘Olyā) is a village in Margown Rural District, Margown District, Boyer-Ahmad County, Kohgiluyeh and Boyer-Ahmad Province, Iran. At the 2006 census, its population was 28, in 4 families.
