= Taksiseh =

Taksiseh (Persian: تاكسيسه) may refer to:

- Taksiseh-ye Olya
- Taksiseh-ye Sofla
