= Bilukhar =

Bilukhar بيلوخر
- Village
- Location within Iran
- Coordinates: 31°01′34″N 51°00′13″E
- Country: Iran
- Province: Kohgiluyeh and Boyer-Ahmad
- County: Boyer-Ahmad
- Bakhsh: Margown
- Rural District: Margown

Population (2006)
  - Total: 555
- Time zone: UTC+3:30 (IRST)
  - Summer (DST): UTC+4:30 (IRDT)

Bilukhar (Persian: بيلوخر, also Romanized as Bīlūkhar; also known as Bīrowkher and Bīrūkher) is a village in Margown Rural District, Margown District, Boyer-Ahmad County, Kohgiluyeh and Boyer-Ahmad Province, Iran. At the 2006 census, its population was 555, in 107 families.
