= Bard-e Pahn =

Bard-e Pahn (Persian: بردپهن) may refer to:

- Bard-e Pahn Abdol Latif
- Bard-e Pahn-e Zilayi
