= Deh Dam Barm Murzard =

Deh Dam Barm Murzard ده دم برم مورزرد
- Village
- Country: Iran
- Province: Kohgiluyeh and Boyer-Ahmad
- County: Boyer-Ahmad
- Bakhsh: Margown
- Rural District: Margown

Population (2006)
  - Total: 44
- Time zone: UTC+3:30 (IRST)
  - Summer (DST): UTC+4:30 (IRDT)

Deh Dam Barm Murzard (Persian: ده دم برم مورزرد, also Romanized as Deh Dam Barm Mūrzard) is a village in Margown Rural District, Margown District, Boyer-Ahmad County, Kohgiluyeh and Boyer-Ahmad Province, Iran. At the 2006 census, its population was 44, in 8 families.
