= Kal Malai-ye Jowkar =

Kal Malai-ye Jowkar كل مله اي جوكار
- Village
- Location within Iran
- Coordinates: 31°04′49″N 50°55′22″E
- Country: Iran
- Province: Kohgiluyeh and Boyer-Ahmad
- County: Boyer-Ahmad
- Bakhsh: Margown
- Rural District: Margown

Population (2006)
  - Total: 85
- Time zone: UTC+3:30 (IRST)
  - Summer (DST): UTC+4:30 (IRDT)

Kal Malai-ye Jowkar (Persian: كل مله اي جوكار, also Romanized as Kal Malā’ī-ye Jowkār; also known as Kal Malā’ī) is a village in Margown Rural District, Margown District, Boyer-Ahmad County, Kohgiluyeh and Boyer-Ahmad Province, Iran. At the 2006 census, its population was 85, in 14 families.
