= Nakhjir =

Nakhgir (location) (نخجیر (موقعیت
- Village
- Location within Iran
- Coordinates: 31°02′51″N 50°57′12″E
- Country: Iran
- Province: Kohgiluyeh and Boyer-Ahmad
- County: Boyer-Ahmad
- Bakhsh: Margown
- Rural District: Margown

Population (2006)
  - Total: 51
- Time zone: UTC+3:30 (IRST)
  - Summer (DST): UTC+4:30 (IRDT)

Nakhgir (Persian: نخجير, also Romanized as Nakhgīr) is a village in Margown Rural District, Margown District, Boyer-Ahmad County, Kohgiluyeh and Boyer-Ahmad Province, Iran. At the 2006 census, its population was 51, in 9 families.
