= Taksiseh-ye Olya =

Taksiseh-ye Olya تاكسيسه عليا
- Village
- Location within Iran
- Coordinates: 31°07′59″N 50°56′05″E
- Country: Iran
- Province: Kohgiluyeh and Boyer-Ahmad
- County: Boyer-Ahmad
- Bakhsh: Margown
- Rural District: Margown

Population (2006)
  - Total: 71
- Time zone: UTC+3:30 (IRST)
  - Summer (DST): UTC+4:30 (IRDT)

Taksiseh-ye Olya (Persian: تاكسيسه عليا, also Romanized as Tāksīseh-ye ‘Olyā) is a village in Margown Rural District, Margown County, Boyer-Ahmad County, Kohgiluyeh and Boyer-Ahmad Province, Iran. At the 2006 census, its population was 71, in 14 families.
