= Naseh Gowd-e Vali Khan-e Jowkar =

Naseh Gowd-e Vali Khan-e Jowkar نسه گودولي خان جوكار
- Village
- Country: Iran
- Province: Kohgiluyeh and Boyer-Ahmad
- County: Boyer-Ahmad
- Bakhsh: Margown
- Rural District: Margown

Population (2006)
  - Total: 83
- Time zone: UTC+3:30 (IRST)
  - Summer (DST): UTC+4:30 (IRDT)

Naseh Gowd-e Vali Khan-e Jowkar (Persian: نسه گودولي خان جوكار, also Romanized as Naseh Gowd-e Valī Khān-e Jowkār) is a village in Margown Rural District, Margown District, Boyer-Ahmad County, Kohgiluyeh and Boyer-Ahmad Province, Iran. At the 2006 census, its population was 83, in 18 families.
