= Talkhari-ye Abbas-e Deligerdu =

Talkhari-ye Abbas-e Deligerdu تل خاري عباس دلي گردو
- Village
- Location within Iran
- Coordinates: 31°05′19″N 51°00′32″E
- Country: Iran
- Province: Kohgiluyeh and Boyer-Ahmad
- County: Boyer-Ahmad
- Bakhsh: Margown
- Rural District: Margown

Population (2006)
  - Total: 19
- Time zone: UTC+3:30 (IRST)
  - Summer (DST): UTC+4:30 (IRDT)

Talkhari-ye Abbas-e Deligerdu (Persian: تل خاري عباس دلي گردو, also Romanized as Talkhārī-ye ʿAbbās-e Delīgerdū; also known as Tall Khārī) is a village in Margown Rural District, Margown District, Boyer-Ahmad County, Kohgiluyeh and Boyer-Ahmad Province, Iran. At the 2006 census, its population was 19, in 4 families.
