= Dowband-e Cheshmeh Puti =

Village in Kohgiluyeh and Boyer-Ahmad, Iran

Dowband-e Cheshmeh Puti دوبندچشمه پوتي
- Village
- Location within Iran
- Coordinates: 31°02′54″N 50°59′56″E
- Country: Iran
- Province: Kohgiluyeh and Boyer-Ahmad
- County: Boyer-Ahmad
- Bakhsh: Margown
- Rural District: Margown

Population (2006)
  - Total: 69
- Time zone: UTC+3:30 (IRST)
  - Summer (DST): UTC+4:30 (IRDT)

Dowband-e Cheshmeh Puti (Persian: دوبندچشمه پوتي, also Romanized as Dowband-e Cheshmeh Pūtī; also known as Dowband) is a village in Margown Rural District, Margown District, Boyer-Ahmad County, Kohgiluyeh and Boyer-Ahmad Province, Iran. At the 2006 census, its population was 69, in 13 families.
