= Mushemi, Margown =

Village in Kohgiluyeh and Boyer-Ahmad province, Iran

Mushemi Persian: موشمي
- Village
- Location within Iran
- Coordinates: 31°21′59″N 50°41′14″E
- Country: Iran
- Province: Kohgiluyeh and Boyer-Ahmad
- County: Margown
- District: Zilayi
- Rural District: Zilayi

Population (2016)
  - Total: 751
- Time zone: UTC+3:30 (IRST)

Mushemi (Persian: موشمي) (Note: Formerly Mushemi-ye Sofla (موشمي سفلي), also romanized as Mūshemī-ye Soflá; also known as Mūshemī-ye Pā’īn) is a village in Zilayi Rural District of Zilayi District, Margown County, Kohgiluyeh and Boyer-Ahmad province, Iran, serving as capital of both the district and the rural district.

== Demographics ==
=== Population ===
At the time of the 2006 National Census, the village's population was 793 in 153 households, when it was Mushemi-e Sofla in the former Margown District of Boyer-Ahmad County. The following census in 2011 counted 1,057 people in 216 households. The 2016 census measured the population of the village as 751 people in 188 households.

In 2018, the district was separated from the county in the establishment of Margown County, and the rural district was transferred to the new Zilayi District.
