= Darreh Bid-e Jowkar =

Darreh Bid-e Jowkar دره‌بید جوکار
- Village
- Location within Iran
- Coordinates: 31°06′49″N 50°52′46″E
- Country: Iran
- Province: Kohgiluyeh and Boyer-Ahmad
- County: Boyer-Ahmad
- Bakhsh: Margown
- Rural District: Margown

Population (2006)
  - Total: 77
- Time zone: UTC+3:30 (IRST)
  - Summer (DST): UTC+4:30 (IRDT)

Darreh Bid-e Jowkar (Persian: دره‌بید جوکار, also Romanized as Darreh Bīd-e Jowkār; also known as Darreh Bīd) is a village in Margown Rural District, Margown District, Boyer-Ahmad County, Kohgiluyeh and Boyer-Ahmad Province, Iran. At the 2006 census, its population was 77, in 16 families.
