= Darbari-ye Jowkar =

Village in Kohgiluyeh and Boyer-Ahmad, Iran

Darbari-ye Jowkar داربري جوكار
- Village
- Location within Iran
- Coordinates: 30°54′23″N 51°02′21″E
- Country: Iran
- Province: Kohgiluyeh and Boyer-Ahmad
- County: Boyer-Ahmad
- Bakhsh: Margown
- Rural District: Margown

Population (2006)
  - Total: 133
- Time zone: UTC+3:30 (IRST)
  - Summer (DST): UTC+4:30 (IRDT)

Darbari-ye Jowkar (Persian: داربري جوكار, also Romanized as Dārbarī-ye Jowkār; also known as Dārbarī and Deh Now-e Dārbar) is a village in Margown Rural District, Margown District, Boyer-Ahmad County, Kohgiluyeh and Boyer-Ahmad Province, Iran. At the 2006 census, its population was 133, in 21 families.
