= Lah Meleh-ye Olya-ye Jowkar =

Lah Meleh-ye Olya-ye Jowkar له مله علياجوكار
- Village
- Country: Iran
- Province: Kohgiluyeh and Boyer-Ahmad
- County: Boyer-Ahmad
- Bakhsh: Margown
- Rural District: Margown

Population (2006)
  - Total: 77
- Time zone: UTC+3:30 (IRST)
  - Summer (DST): UTC+4:30 (IRDT)

Lah Meleh-ye Olya-ye Jowkar (Persian: له مله علياجوكار, also Romanized as Lah Meleh-ye ‘Olyā-ye Jowkār) is a village in Margown Rural District, Margown District, Boyer-Ahmad County, Kohgiluyeh and Boyer-Ahmad Province, Iran. At the 2006 census, its population was 77, in 14 families.
