= Taksiseh-ye Sofla =

Village in Kohgiluyeh and Boyer-Ahmad, Iran

Taksiseh-ye Sofla تاكسيسه سفلي
- Village
- Location within Iran
- Coordinates: 31°08′14″N 50°55′48″E
- Country: Iran
- Province: Kohgiluyeh and Boyer-Ahmad
- County: Boyer-Ahmad
- Bakhsh: Margown
- Rural District: Margown

Population (2006)
  - Total: 135
- Time zone: UTC+3:30 (IRST)
  - Summer (DST): UTC+4:30 (IRDT)

Taksiseh-ye Sofla (Persian: تاكسيسه سفلي, also Romanized as Tāksīseh-ye Soflá; also known as Taksīseh) is a village in Margown Rural District, Margown District, Boyer-Ahmad County, Kohgiluyeh and Boyer-Ahmad Province, Iran. At the 2006 census, its population was 135, in 24 families.
