= Shurum Rural District =

Rural district in Kohgiluyeh and Boyer-Ahmad province, Iran

Shurum Rural District Persian: دهستان شوروم
- Rural District
- Location within Iran
- Coordinates: 31°15′01″N 50°48′36″E
- Country: Iran
- Province: Kohgiluyeh and Boyer-Ahmad
- County: Margown
- District: Zilayi
- Capital: Puleh
- Time zone: UTC+3:30 (IRST)

Shurum Rural District (Persian: دهستان شوروم) is in Zilayi District of Margown County, Kohgiluyeh and Boyer-Ahmad province, Iran. Its capital is the village of Puleh, whose population at the time of the 2016 National Census was 266 in 60 households.

== History ==
In 2018, Margown District was separated from Boyer-Ahmad County in the establishment of Margown County, and Shurum Rural District was created in the new Zilayi District.
