= Darreh Bid-e Murzard =

Darreh Bid-e Murzard دره‌بید مورزرد
- Village
- Location within Iran
- Coordinates: 31°12′28″N 50°49′08″E
- Country: Iran
- Province: Kohgiluyeh and Boyer-Ahmad
- County: Boyer-Ahmad
- Bakhsh: Margown
- Rural District: Margown

Population (2006)
  - Total: 151
- Time zone: UTC+3:30 (IRST)
  - Summer (DST): UTC+4:30 (IRDT)

Darreh Bid-e Murzard (Persian: دره‌بید مورزرد, also Romanized as Darreh Bīd-e Mūrzard; also known as Darreh Bīd) is a village in Margown Rural District, Margown District, Boyer-Ahmad County, Kohgiluyeh and Boyer-Ahmad Province, Iran. At the 2006 census, its population was 151, in 32 families.
