= Dalun Rural District =

Rural district in Kohgiluyeh and Boyer-Ahmad province, Iran

Dalun Rural District Persian: دهستان دالون
- Rural District
- Location within Iran
- Coordinates: 31°14′16″N 50°43′21″E
- Country: Iran
- Province: Kohgiluyeh and Boyer-Ahmad
- County: Margown
- District: Central
- Capital: Jowkar
- Time zone: UTC+3:30 (IRST)

Dalun Rural District (Persian: دهستان دالون) is in the Central District of Margown County, Kohgiluyeh and Boyer-Ahmad province, Iran. Its capital is the village of Jowkar, whose population at the time of the 2016 National Census was 332 in 76 households.

== History ==
In 2018, Margown District was separated from Boyer-Ahmad County in the establishment of Margown County, and Dalun Rural District was created in the new Central District.
