= Mushemi-ye Olya =

Mushemi-ye Olya موشمي عليا
- Village
- Location within Iran
- Coordinates: 31°11′13″N 50°29′10″E
- Country: Iran
- Province: Kohgiluyeh and Boyer-Ahmad
- County: Boyer-Ahmad
- Bakhsh: Margown
- Rural District: Zilayi

Population (2006)
  - Total: 114
- Time zone: UTC+3:30 (IRST)
  - Summer (DST): UTC+4:30 (IRDT)

Mushemi-ye Olya (Persian: موشمي عليا, also Romanized as Mūshemī-ye ‘Olyā; also known as Mūshemī and Mūshemī-ye Bālā) is a village in Zilayi Rural District, Margown District, Boyer-Ahmad County, Kohgiluyeh and Boyer-Ahmad Province, Iran. At the 2006 census, its population was 114, in 27 families.
