= Darbari-ye Mohammad Hoseyn Zilayi =

Village in Kohgiluyeh and Boyer-Ahmad, Iran

Darbari-ye Mohammad Hoseyn Zilayi داربري محمدحسين ذيلائي
- Village
- Location within Iran
- Coordinates: 31°11′19″N 50°50′26″E
- Country: Iran
- Province: Kohgiluyeh and Boyer-Ahmad
- County: Boyer-Ahmad
- Bakhsh: Margown
- Rural District: Margown

Population (2006)
  - Total: 271
- Time zone: UTC+3:30 (IRST)
  - Summer (DST): UTC+4:30 (IRDT)

Darbari-ye Mohammad Hoseyn Zilayi (Persian: داربري محمدحسين ذيلائي, also Romanized as Dārbarī-ye Moḩammad Ḩoseyn Zīlāyī; also known as Dārbarī-ye Soflá) is a village in Margown Rural District, Margown District, Boyer-Ahmad County, Kohgiluyeh and Boyer-Ahmad Province, Iran. At the 2006 census, its population was 271, in 49 families.
