= Lah Meleh-ye Sofla-ye Jowkar =

Lah Meleh-ye Sofla-ye Jowkar له مله سفلي جوكار
- Village
- Country: Iran
- Province: Kohgiluyeh and Boyer-Ahmad
- County: Boyer-Ahmad
- Bakhsh: Margown
- Rural District: Margown

Population (2006)
  - Total: 73
- Time zone: UTC+3:30 (IRST)
  - Summer (DST): UTC+4:30 (IRDT)

Lah Meleh-ye Sofla-ye Jowkar (Persian: له مله سفلي جوكار, also Romanized as Lah Meleh-ye Soflá-ye Jowkār) is a village in Margown Rural District, Margown District, Boyer-Ahmad County, Kohgiluyeh and Boyer-Ahmad Province, Iran. At the 2006 census, its population was 73, in 11 families.
