= Chahar Murun-e Jowkar =

Chahar Murun-e Jowkar چهارمورون جوكار
- Village
- Location within Iran
- Coordinates: 31°00′12″N 51°03′02″E
- Country: Iran
- Province: Kohgiluyeh and Boyer-Ahmad
- County: Boyer-Ahmad
- Bakhsh: Margown
- Rural District: Margown

Population (2006)
  - Total: 300
- Time zone: UTC+3:30 (IRST)
  - Summer (DST): UTC+4:30 (IRDT)

Chahar Murun-e Jowkar (Persian: چهارمورون جوكار, also Romanized as Chahār Mūrūn-e Jowkār; also known as Chahār Mūrūn) is a village in Margown Rural District, Margown District, Boyer-Ahmad County, Kohgiluyeh and Boyer-Ahmad Province, Iran. At the 2006 census, its population was 300, in 51 families.
