= Talkhari-ye Bandar-e Deligerdu =

Talkhari-ye Bandar-e Deligerdu تل خاري بندردلي گردو
- Village
- Location within Iran
- Coordinates: 31°05′30″N 51°00′25″E
- Country: Iran
- Province: Kohgiluyeh and Boyer-Ahmad
- County: Boyer-Ahmad
- Bakhsh: Margown
- Rural District: Margown

Population (2006)
  - Total: 33
- Time zone: UTC+3:30 (IRST)
  - Summer (DST): UTC+4:30 (IRDT)

Talkhari-ye Bandar-e Deligerdu (Persian: تل خاري بندردلي گردو, also Romanized as Talkhārī-ye Bandar-e Delīgerdū; also known as Talkhārī-ye Bandar) is a village in Margown Rural District, Margown District, Boyer-Ahmad County, Kohgiluyeh and Boyer-Ahmad Province, Iran. At the 2006 census, its population was 33, in 5 families.
