= Chahar Murun-e Tamdari =

Chahar Murun-e Tamdari چهارمورون تمداري
- Village
- Location within Iran
- Coordinates: 31°05′29″N 50°54′55″E
- Country: Iran
- Province: Kohgiluyeh and Boyer-Ahmad
- County: Boyer-Ahmad
- Bakhsh: Margown
- Rural District: Margown

Population (2006)
  - Total: 41
- Time zone: UTC+3:30 (IRST)
  - Summer (DST): UTC+4:30 (IRDT)

Chahar Murun-e Tamdari (Persian: چهارمورون تمداري, also Romanized as Chahār Mūrūn-e Tamdārī; also known as Chahār Morūn and Chahār Mūrūn) is a village in Margown Rural District, Margown District, Boyer-Ahmad County, Kohgiluyeh and Boyer-Ahmad Province, Iran. At the 2006 census, its population was 41, in 6 families.
