= Zilayi District =

District in Kohgiluyeh and Boyer-Ahmad province, Iran

Zilayi District Persian: بخش زیلائی
- District
- Location within Iran
- Coordinates: 31°17′37″N 50°45′50″E
- Country: Iran
- Province: Kohgiluyeh and Boyer-Ahmad
- County: Margown
- Capital: Mushemi
- Time zone: UTC+3:30 (IRST)

Zilayi District (Persian: بخش زیلائی) is in Margown County, Kohgiluyeh and Boyer-Ahmad province, Iran. Its capital is the village of Mushemi, whose population at the time of the 2016 National Census was 751 in 188 households. (Note: Formerly Mushemi-ye Sofla)

== History ==
In 2018, Margown District was separated from Boyer-Ahmad County in the establishment of Margown County, which was divided into two districts of two rural districts each, with Margown as its capital and only city.

== Demographics ==
=== Administrative divisions ===
Zilayi District
Administrative Divisions
Shurum RD
Zilayi RD
RD = Rural District
