= Darreh Bid, Bazoft =

Darreh Bid دره‌بید
- Village
- Location within Iran
- Coordinates: 32°12′09″N 50°17′11″E
- Country: Iran
- Province: Chaharmahal and Bakhtiari
- County: Kuhrang
- Bakhsh: Bazoft
- Rural District: Doab

Population (2006)
  - Total: 102
- Time zone: UTC+3:30 (IRST)
  - Summer (DST): UTC+4:30 (IRDT)

Darreh Bid (Persian: دره‌بید, also Romanized as Darreh Bīd) is a village in Doab Rural District, Bazoft District, Kuhrang County, Chaharmahal and Bakhtiari Province, Iran. At the 2006 census, its population was 102, in 18 families. The village is populated by Lurs.
