= Darbari-ye Dam-e Abbas =

Darbari-ye Dam-e Abbas داربري دم عباس
- Village
- Country: Iran
- Province: Kohgiluyeh and Boyer-Ahmad
- County: Kohgiluyeh
- Bakhsh: Central
- Rural District: Doshman Ziari

Population (2006)
  - Total: 36
- Time zone: UTC+3:30 (IRST)
  - Summer (DST): UTC+4:30 (IRDT)

Darbari-ye Dam-e Abbas (Persian: داربري دم عباس, also romanized as Dārbarī-ye Dam-e ʿAbbās) is a village in Doshman Ziari Rural District, in the Central District of Kohgiluyeh County, Kohgiluyeh and Boyer-Ahmad Province, Iran. As of the 2006 census, it had a population of 36, comprising 7 families.
