= Darreh Bidi Sefidar =

Darreh Bidi Sefidar دره‌بیدی سفیدار
- Village
- Location within Iran
- Coordinates: 30°36′26″N 51°20′32″E
- Country: Iran
- Province: Kohgiluyeh and Boyer-Ahmad
- County: Boyer-Ahmad
- Bakhsh: Central
- Rural District: Sepidar

Population (2006)
  - Total: 56
- Time zone: UTC+3:30 (IRST)
  - Summer (DST): UTC+4:30 (IRDT)

Darreh Bidi Sefidar (Persian: دره‌بیدی سفیدار, also Romanized as Darreh Bīdī Sefīdār; also known as Darreh Bīd) is a village in Sepidar Rural District, in the Central District of Boyer-Ahmad County, Kohgiluyeh and Boyer-Ahmad Province, Iran. At the 2006 census, its population was 56, in 11 families.
