= Darreh Bid, Khuzestan =

Darreh Bid دره‌بید
- Village
- Location within Iran
- Coordinates: 31°33′24″N 49°14′49″E
- Country: Iran
- Province: Khuzestan
- County: Haftgel
- Bakhsh: Raghiveh
- Rural District: Gazin

Population (2006)
  - Total: 208
- Time zone: UTC+3:30 (IRST)
  - Summer (DST): UTC+4:30 (IRDT)

Darreh Bid (Persian: دره‌بید, also Romanized as Darreh Bīd and Darreh-ye Bīd; also known as Seyyed Yūnesī) is a village in Gazin Rural District, Raghiveh District, Haftgel County, Khuzestan Province, Iran. At the 2006 census, its population was 208, in 41 families.
