= Darreh Bid, Kuhrang =

Darreh Bid دره‌بید
- Village
- Location within Iran
- Coordinates: 32°23′35″N 50°20′47″E
- Country: Iran
- Province: Chaharmahal and Bakhtiari
- County: Kuhrang
- Bakhsh: Central
- Rural District: Dasht-e Zarrin

Population (2006)
  - Total: 104
- Time zone: UTC+3:30 (IRST)
  - Summer (DST): UTC+4:30 (IRDT)

Darreh Bid (Persian: دره‌بید, also Romanized as Darreh Bīd and Darrehbīd) is a village in Dasht-e Zarrin Rural District, in the Central District of Kuhrang County, Chaharmahal and Bakhtiari Province, Iran. At the 2006 census, its population was 104, in 18 families. The village is populated by Lurs.
