= Central District (Margown County) =

District in Kohgiluyeh and Boyer-Ahmad province, Iran

Central District (Margown County) Persian: بخش مرکزی شهرستان مارگون
- District
- Location within Iran
- Coordinates: 31°10′N 50°51′E
- Country: Iran
- Province: Kohgiluyeh and Boyer-Ahmad
- County: Margown
- Capital: Margown
- Time zone: UTC+3:30 (IRST)

The Central District of Margown County (Persian: بخش مرکزی شهرستان مارگون) is in Kohgiluyeh and Boyer-Ahmad province, Iran. Its capital is the city of Margown, whose population at the time of the 2016 National Census was 3,135 in 797 households.

== History ==
In 2018, Margown District was separated from Boyer-Ahmad County in the establishment of Margown County, which was divided into two districts of two rural districts each, with Margown as its capital and only city.

== Demographics ==
=== Administrative divisions ===
Central District (Margown County)
Administrative Divisions
Dalun RD
Margown RD
Margown (city)
RD = Rural District
