= Darreh Bid, Kohgiluyeh and Boyer-Ahmad =

Darreh Bid دره‌بید
- Village
- Location within Iran
- Coordinates: 30°59′05″N 50°58′07″E
- Country: Iran
- Province: Kohgiluyeh and Boyer-Ahmad
- County: Bahmai
- Bakhsh: Bahmai-ye Garmsiri
- Rural District: Bahmai-ye Garmsiri-ye Shomali

Population (2006)
  - Total: 391
- Time zone: UTC+3:30 (IRST)
  - Summer (DST): UTC+4:30 (IRDT)

Darreh Bid (Persian: دره‌بید, also Romanized as Darreh Bīd; also known as Darreh Bīn) is a village in Bahmai-ye Garmsiri-ye Shomali Rural District, Bahmai-ye Garmsiri District, Bahmai County, Kohgiluyeh and Boyer-Ahmad Province, Iran. At the 2006 census, its population was 391, in 65 families.
