= Bard-e Pahn Abdol Latif =

Bard-e Pahn Abdol Latif بردپهن عبداللطيف
- Village
- Location within Iran
- Coordinates: 30°37′57″N 51°19′07″E
- Country: Iran
- Province: Kohgiluyeh and Boyer-Ahmad
- County: Boyer-Ahmad
- Bakhsh: Central
- Rural District: Sepidar

Population (2006)
  - Total: 49
- Time zone: UTC+3:30 (IRST)
  - Summer (DST): UTC+4:30 (IRDT)

Bard-e Pahn Abdol Latif (Persian: بردپهن عبداللطيف, also Romanized as Bard-e Pahn ʿAbdol Laṭīf; also known as Bard-e Pahn, Bard Pahnī, and Sang-e Pahn) is a village in Sepidar Rural District, in the Central District of Boyer-Ahmad County, Kohgiluyeh and Boyer-Ahmad Province, Iran. At the 2006 census, its population was 49, in 8 families, 6.1 people per family.
