= Margown =

City in Kohgiluyeh and Boyer-Ahmad province, Iran

Margown Persian: مارگون
- City
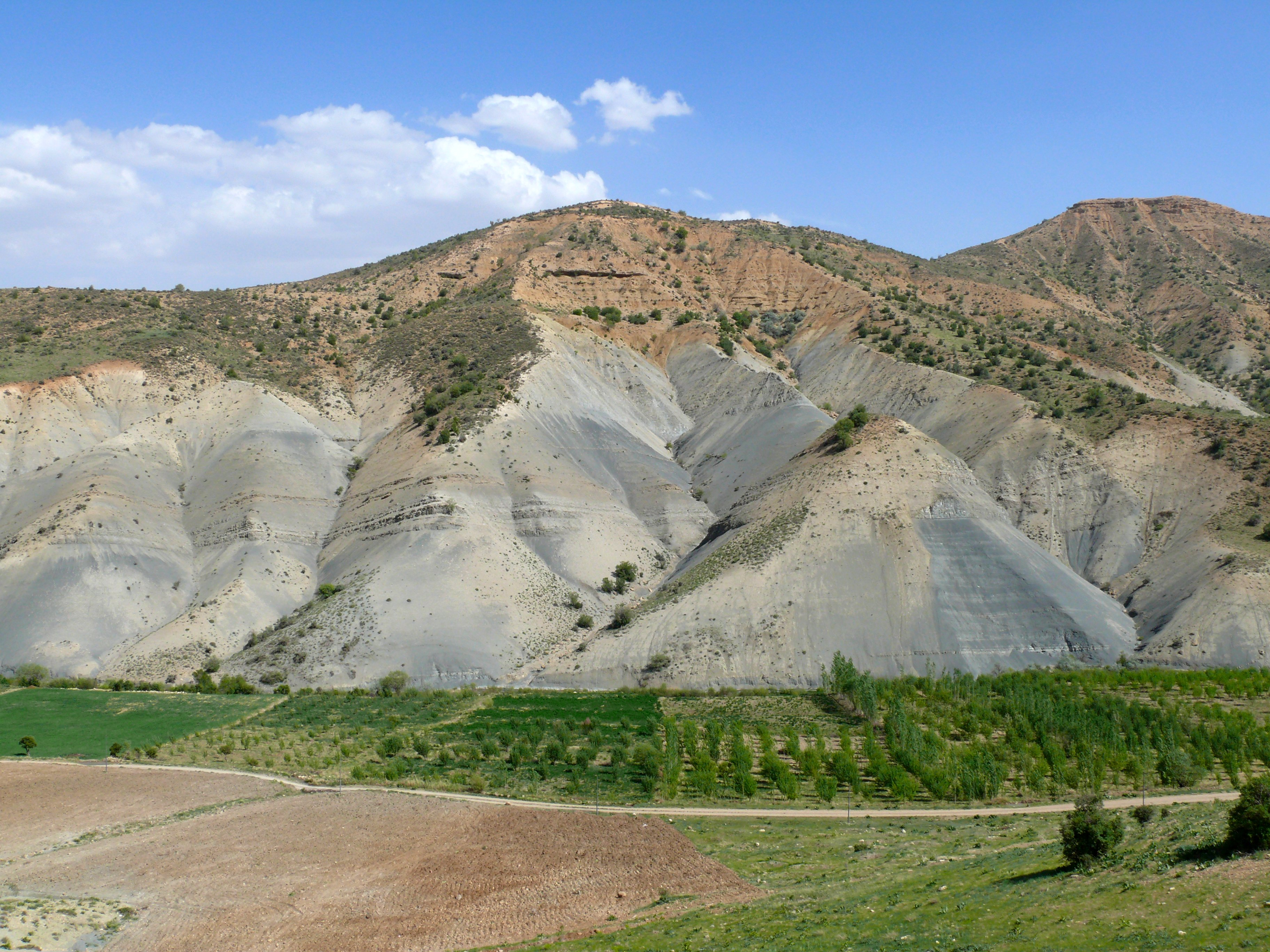
- Margown fields

- Location within Iran
- Coordinates: 30°59′33″N 51°04′57″E
- Country: Iran
- Province: Kohgiluyeh and Boyer-Ahmad
- County: Margown
- District: Central

Population (2016)
  - Total: 3,135
- Time zone: UTC+3:30 (IRST)

Margown (Persian: مارگون) (Note: Also romanized as Māregūn and Mārgown; also known as Mārjān and Mārkān) is a city in the Central District of Margown County, Kohgiluyeh and Boyer-Ahmad province, Iran, serving as capital of both the county and the district. It is also the administrative center for Margown Rural District.

== Demographics ==
=== Population ===
At the time of the 2006 National Census, the city's population was 2,538 in 497 households, when it was capital of the former Margown District of Boyer-Ahmad County. The following census in 2011 counted 2,706 people in 666 households. The 2016 census measured the population of the city as 3,135 people in 797 households.

In 2018, the district was separated from the county in the establishment of Margown County. The city and the rural district were transferred to the new Central District, with Margown as the county's capital.
