= Margown County =

County in Kohgiluyeh and Boyer-Ahmad province, Iran

Margown County Persian: شهرستان مارگون
- County
- Location of Margown County in Kohgiluyeh and Boyer-Ahmad province (top, purple)

- Location of Kohgiluyeh and Boyer-Ahmad province in Iran
- Coordinates: 31°10′N 50°51′E
- Country: Iran
- Province: Kohgiluyeh and Boyer-Ahmad
- Capital: Margown
- Districts: Central, Zilayi
- Time zone: UTC+3:30 (IRST)

Margown County (Persian: شهرستان مارگون) is in Kohgiluyeh and Boyer-Ahmad province, Iran. Its capital is the city of Margown, whose population at the time of the 2016 National Census was 3,135 in 797 households.

== History ==
In 2018, Margown District was separated from Boyer-Ahmad County in the establishment of Margown County, which was divided into two districts of two rural districts each, with Margown as its capital and only city.

== Demographics ==
=== Administrative divisions ===
Margown County's administrative structure is shown in the following table.

Margown County Population
Administrative Divisions
Central District
Dalun RD
Margown RD
Margown (city)
Zilayi District
Shurum RD
Zilayi RD
RD = Rural District

== See also ==
Media related to Margown County at Wikimedia Commons
