= Zilayi Rural District =

Rural district in Kohgiluyeh and Boyer-Ahmad province, Iran

Zilayi Rural District Persian: دهستان زيلائي
- Rural District
- Location within Iran
- Coordinates: 31°22′02″N 50°39′49″E
- Country: Iran
- Province: Kohgiluyeh and Boyer-Ahmad
- County: Margown
- District: Zilayi
- Capital: Mushemi

Population (2016)
  - Total: 9,343
- Time zone: UTC+3:30 (IRST)

Zilayi Rural District (Persian: دهستان زيلائي) is in Zilayi District of Margown County, Kohgiluyeh and Boyer-Ahmad province, Iran. Its capital is the village of Mushemi. (Note: Formerly Mushemi-ye Sofla)

== Demographics ==
=== Population ===
At the time of the 2006 National Census, the rural district's population (as a part of the former Margown District of Boyer-Ahmad County) was 11,041 in 2,163 households. There were 10,595 inhabitants in 2,316 households at the following census of 2011. The 2016 census measured the population of the rural district as 9,343 in 2,246 households. The most populous of its 83 villages was Bard-e Pahn-e Zilayi, with 1,059 people.

In 2018, the district was separated from the county in the establishment of Margown County, and the rural district was transferred to the new Zilayi District.
