= Margown Rural District =

Rural district in Kohgiluyeh and Boyer-Ahmad province, Iran

Margown Rural District Persian: دهستان مارگون
- Rural District
- Location within Iran
- Coordinates: 31°02′42″N 51°00′46″E
- Country: Iran
- Province: Kohgiluyeh and Boyer-Ahmad
- County: Margown
- District: Central
- Capital: Margown

Population (2016)
  - Total: 7,398
- Time zone: UTC+3:30 (IRST)

Margown Rural District (Persian: دهستان مارگون) is in the Central District of Margown County, Kohgiluyeh and Boyer-Ahmad province, Iran. It is administered from the city of Margown.

== Demographics ==
=== Population ===
At the time of the 2006 National Census, the rural district's population (as a part of the former Margown District of Boyer-Ahmad County) was 9,440 in 1,771 households. There were 7,636 inhabitants in 1,753 households at the following census of 2011. The 2016 census measured the population of the rural district as 7,398 in 1,880 households. The most populous of its 127 villages was Shahniz, with 781 people.

In 2018, the district was separated from the county in the establishment of Margown County, and the rural district was transferred to the new Central District.
