= Margown District =

Former district in Kohgiluyeh and Boyer-Ahmad province, Iran

Margown District Persian: بخش مارگون
- Former District
- Location within Iran
- Coordinates: 31°10′N 50°51′E
- Country: Iran
- Province: Kohgiluyeh and Boyer-Ahmad
- County: Boyer-Ahmad
- Capital: Margown

Population (2016)
  - Total: 19,876
- Time zone: UTC+3:30 (IRST)

Margown District (Persian: بخش مارگون) is a former administrative division of Boyer-Ahmad County, Kohgiluyeh and Boyer-Ahmad province, Iran. Its capital was the city of Margown.

== History ==
After the 2016 National Census, the district was separated from the county in the establishment of Margown County.

== Demographics ==
=== Population ===
At the time of the 2006 census, the district's population was 23,019 in 4,431 households. The following census in 2011 counted 20,937 people in 4,735 households. The 2016 census measured the population of the district as 19,876 inhabitants in 4,923 households.

=== Administrative divisions ===
Margown District Population
Administrative Divisions	2006	2011	2016
Margown RD	9,440	7,636	7,398
Zilayi RD	11,041	10,595	9,343
Margown (city)	2,538	2,706	3,135
Total	23,019	20,937	19,876
RD = Rural District
