= List of cities, towns and villages in Chaharmahal and Bakhtiari province =

A list of cities, towns and villages in Chaharmahal and Bakhtiari Province of central Iran:

== Alphabetical ==
Cities are in bold text; all others are villages.

=== A ===
Ab Bidak | Ab Chenar | Ab Chenar-e Olya | Ab Chenar-e Sofla | Ab Kalaiyeh-ye Do | Ab Kalaiyeh-ye Yek | Ab Kharreh | Ab Laran | Ab Sardeh | Ab Talak | Ab Talkhak | Abbasabad | Abbas-e Aliabad | Ab-e Gelur | Absharan-e Olya | Absharan-e Sofla | Abu Eshaq-e Olya | Abu Eshaq-e Sofla | Abu ol Qasemabad | Abza-e Sar Dasht | Abzir | Adelabad | Aduk | Afsarabad | Ahmad Khvajeh | Ahmadabad | Akbarabad | Alborzabad | Algi-ye Olya | Algi-ye Sofla | Ali Asgar | Ali Hemmatabad-e Tahmasabi | Aliabad | Aliabad | Aliabad-e Poshteh | Alikuh | Aluni | Alurak | Amirabad | Amirabad | Amirabad | Amiran-e Olya | Amiran-e Sofla | Amiri-ye Olya | Amiri-ye Sofla | Anju | Aqbolagh | Aqbolagh | Ardal | Arjal | Arjenak | Armand-e Olya | Armand-e Sofla | Arteh | Asadabad | Atashgah | Avargan | Ay Naz | Azadegan | Azizabad-e Olya | Azizabad-e Sofla

=== B ===
Baba Mansur | Babaheydar | Badamestan-e Amid Ali | Badamestan-e Aqajun | Badamestan-e Mashhadiamir | Badreh-ye Semi Yagardava | Bagh Anar-e Milas | Bagh Chenar | Bagh Kaj | Bagh-e Algi | Bagh-e Behzad | Bagh-e Mohammad Ali | Bahmanabad | Bahramabad | Bajgiran | Bakhshabad | Baled | Bandun-e Olya | Banuastaki | Bar Aftab-e Khonk | Bar Aftab-e Milas | Bar Aftab-e Sardasht | Bar Aftab-e Shidan | Bar Aftab-e Shirani | Bard Bor | Bard-e Karkhaneh | Bardeh | Beheshtabad | Ben | Berenjgan | Berjui | Biabeh | Bid Gol | Bidamin | Bideleh | Birahgan | Bizh Gerd | Bizhgan | Bohlulabad | Boldaji | Borujen | Buger

=== C ===
Chagha Hast | Chah Gah | Chahak | Chahar Deh | Chahar Muran | Chahar Taq | Chahgah | Chahgah-e Milas | Chal Betan | Chal Chendar | Chal Khazineh | Chal Shirin | Chalderaz-e Beytollah | Chalderaz-e Esfandiyar | Chalderaz-e Gholamali | Chalderaz-e Hadi | Chalderaz-e Yadollah | Chaleshtar | Chalku | Cham Chang | Cham Jangal | Cham Kaka | Cham Khalifeh | Cham Qaleh | Chamabad | Chaman Bid | Chaman Goli | Cham-e Ali | Cham-e Khorram | Cham-e Nar | Cham-e Zin | Charmineh | Chehraz | Chel Mangasiun-e Sofla | Chelabad | Chelbardi | Cheleh Gah | Chelgard | Chelvan | Chenar-e Mahmudi | Chendeh | Cherken | Cheshmeh Ali | Cheshmeh Choli | Cheshmeh Khani | Cheshmeh Soleyman | Chevilan | Chigu | Chilteh-ye Dudera | Chin | Cholicheh | Chubin | Chuleh Dan

=== D ===
Dam Ab | Dam Ab | Dam Ab | Dam Tang | Darakeh | Darjuneh | Darkabad | Darreh Bagh | Darreh Bagh | Darreh Bala | Darreh Bid | Darreh Bid | Darreh Bideyeneh | Darreh Buran | Darreh Dun | Darreh Eshq | Darreh Gavmish | Darreh Hendu | Darreh Mula | Darreh Namdari | Darreh Niyak | Darreh Qahti | Darreh Ru Ab | Darreh Shir | Darreh Shur | Darreh Shur | Darreh Shur | Darreh Shur-e Khong | Darreh Shur-e Mehdi | Darreh Tut | Darreh Yas | Darreh Zargeh | Darrehbid | Darreh-ye Eshgaft | Darreh-ye Pir | Darreh-ye Quti | Dashtak | Dasht-e Pagerd | Dashti | Dashtineh | Dastana | Dastgerd | Dastgerd | Dastgerd-e Emamzadeh | Deh Ali | Deh Ali | Deh Bagh | Deh Barez | Deh Chenar | Deh Chenar-e Dalvara | Deh Chenar-e Olya | Deh Chenar-e Sofla | Deh Cheshmeh | Deh Deli | Deh Gah | Deh Kohneh | Deh Kohneh-ye Emamzadeh | Deh Kohneh-ye Halu Saad | Deh Kohneh-ye Rugar | Deh Now | Deh Now | Deh Now-e Allah Morad | Deh Now-e Gork Allah | Deh Now-e Gudsar | Deh Now-e Hushang Khan | Deh Now-e Milas | Deh Now-ye Barez | Deh Now-ye Olya | Deh Now-ye Sofla | Deh Rashid | Deh Sahra | Deh Sukhteh | Deh Tall | Deh Tut | Deh-e Azizi Gandomkar-e Vosta | Deh-e Baba | Deh-e Bagh | Deh-e Golabi-ye Olya | Deh-e Khalili | Deh-e Kohneh | Deh-e Sukhteh | Deh-e Torkan | Dehgeh-ye Shah Mansuri | Dehkhoda | Dehnash | Dehnow | Dehnow | Dehnow-e Abbasali | Dehnow-e Alibaba | Dehnow-e Gudarz | Dehnow-e Mohammad Qoli | Dehnow-e Shams Ali | Dehnownadeh | Dehnow-ye Olya | Dehnow-ye Sofla | Dehzir-e Dudera | Deli | Deymeh | Dezak | Dezak-e Olya | Dezak-e Sarcheshmeh | Dezak-e Sofla | Do Makan | Do Polan | Dowleh Khargush | Dowrahan | Duleh Sib | Durak Qanbari | Durak Rahman | Durak | Durak-e Olya | Durak-e Shapuri | Durak-e Sofla | Duruzanabad

=== E ===
Ebdalabad | Emam Qeys | Emamabad | Emamabad | Emamabad | Emamzadeh Darvishan | Emamzadeh Esmail | Eshgaftak | Eslamabad | Eslamabad | Eslamabad | Eslamabad | Eslamabad | Eslamabad | Eslamabad-e Yek | Esmiabad | Ezzatabad

=== F ===
Faj | Fakhrabad | Faniabad | Faradonbeh | Farrokh Shahr | Farrokhabad | Farsan | Farsun | Fathabad | Feryak | Feyzabad | Filabad | Firuzabad

=== G ===
Gahkadeh | Gahru | Galamtin | Gandab | Gandoman | Gandoman Industrial Estate | Gandomkar-e Olya | Gandomkar-e Sofla | Gangarestan | Ganj | Garab | Gargar | Garmdarreh | Gav Shir | Gav Tut | Gavdaneh | Gavzalak | Gazestan | Gel-e Shur | Gerd Bisheh | Gerdab-e Olya | Gerdab-e Sofla | Gerdopineh | Gerdu-ye Olya | Gerdu-ye Sofla | Geshinerjan | Geysaran | Gharba | Gholamabad | Gholamabad | Godar-e Kabk | Golabad | Golabi-ye Sofla | Gol-e Sorkh | Gorazabad | Gowd Sar | Gowd-e Banushir | Gujan | Gurun | Gusheh | Gusheh | Gusheh | Gushki

=== H ===
Hafshejan | Haft Piran | Hajji Jalil | Hajjiabad | Hajjiabad | Hajjiabad | Hajjiabad | Hajjiabad | Hamidabad | Hamzehabad | Harchegan | Hardan | Harmu | Haruni | Hasan Hendow | Hatamabad | Heydarabad | Heydarabad-e Meyheh | Heydari | Hezar Jerib | Horbekul | Hoseynabad | Hoseynabad | Hoseynabad | Hoseynabad | Hureh | Hushut

=== I ===
Ilbegi | Industrial Estate | Industrial Estate | Inekak | Irancheh | Isaabad

=== J ===
Jafarabad | Jaghd | Jaghdan | Jaju-ye Faj | Jamalabad | Jamalvi-ye Jadid | Jaman | Jarjish | Javanmardi | Jowzestan | Jub Nesa | Junqan

=== K ===
Kachuz | Kah Kesh | Kahidan | Kaj | Kakolak | Kal Gechi | Kal Geh-ye Sardasht | Kalamui | Kalat | Kalbi Bak | Kall Ab Chenar | Kallar-e Olya | Kallar-e Sofla | Kalvari | Kalvari-ye Olya | Kalvari-ye Sofla | Kanemi | Karan | Karavanserai-ye Shalil | Karch-e Sofla | Karf-e Olya | Karf-e Sofla | Karimabad | Karimabad | Karkon-e Olya | Karkon-e Sofla | Karri Chahar Bonicheh | Kartogol | Katak | Katak-e Olya | Katak-e Sofla | Katula | Kavanak | Kavand-e Darvishan | Kerat Gol-e Sofla | Kesri | Keykavus | Khalilabad | Khalilabad | Khaniabad | Kharaji | Khardan | Khederabad | Kheyrabad | Khiyarkar | Khosrowabad | Khosrowabad | Khunkar | Khuyeh | Khvoy | Kian | Kinak | Kohyan | Kol Koleh | Konarak-e Bala | Konarak-e Pain | Kondar | Kord-e Shami | Kufi | Kuh Narmeh | Kul Sorkh | Kuy-e Shahid Beheshti

=== L ===
Lachenar | Lah-e Deraz | Lahmari-ye Do | Lakhoshk | Landi | Larak | Laveh | Lebd-e Olya | Lebd-e Sofla | Leh Deraz | Lir Abi | Lir Abi | Lir | Lir-e Shamlek | Lordegan | Loshtar-e Gavaruyi |

=== M ===
Madan | Mahmudabad | Mahrik | Mal-e Khalifeh | Malek Shir | Malekabad | Malekabad | Malekabad-e Yek | Mamureh | Manj-e Baraftab | Manj-e Jahrub | Manj-e Nesa | Mard-e Khaneh | Margh Malek | Markadeh | Mashg Duzan | Matui | Mavarz | Mazeh Faramarzi | Mazeh-ye Sardasht | Mehdiabad | Mehdiabad-e Yek | Mehdiyeh | Mesen | Mezan | Mian Ab | Mian Dowhan-e Olya | Mian Dowhan-e Sofla | Mian Qaleh | Mian Rudan-e Yek | Mian Talan | Michqavan-e Olya | Michqavan-e Sofla | Milan-e Baba Ahmadi | Milas | Mishan-e Olya | Mishan-e Sofla | Miyanju | Mohammadabad | Mohammadabad-e Tabatabayi | Mohammadabad-e Yek | Monarjan | Monjar Mui | Moradabad | Mostafaabad | Mostafaabad | Mownowm | Muchan | Murchegan | Murdel | Musaabad | Musaabad

=== N ===
Naderabad | Nafech | Naghan | Naghan-e Olya | Naghan-e Sofla | Nal Eshkenan-e Olya | Nal Eshkenan-e Sofla | Nalbandun | Naqneh | Naqneh | Nargili | Narmeh-ye Olya | Narmeh-ye Sofla | Nasirabad | Nasirabad | Nasirabad | Nasirabad | Nasirabad | Nasirabad-e Galeh | Nazak | Nazarabad | Nazi | Nesa Kuh | Neysiyaq | Niakan | Nokhvodkar | Nowabad | Nowtaraki | Nurabad

=== O ===
Omidabad

=== P ===
Pacheh Gav | Pagach | Pahna | Pardanjan | Parvaz | Pataveh | Pir Ali | Pir Balut | Piran | Pol Barez | Pol Borideh | Puraz

=== Q ===
Qaidan | Qaleh Barez | Qaleh Darvish | Qaleh Rashid | Qaleh Sabzi | Qaleh Salim | Qaleh Sukhteh | Qaleh Tak | Qaleh Tak | Qalehcheh | Qalehcheh | Qaleh-ye Afghan | Qaleh-ye Ali Hoseyn Seljuki | Qaleh-ye Aliabad | Qaleh-ye Bakhtiar | Qaleh-ye Eqbal | Qaleh-ye Fereydun | Qaleh-ye Hajj Jahanqoli | Qaleh-ye Kashgi | Qaleh-ye Madraseh | Qaleh-ye Mamka | Qaleh-ye Mozal | Qaleh-ye Omidabad | Qaleh-ye Sangi | Qaleh-ye Shah Vali Shahid Rajayi | Qaleh-ye Someh | Qaleh-ye Tabarak | Qanbar Sini | Qarah | Qaraqush | Qaribabad | Qasemabad | Qateh | Qobadabad | Qorab | Quchan

=== R ===
Rahimabad | Rahimabad | Raki | Ram Run | Rastab | Razgeh | Refen | Rigak | Rostam Beyg | Rostamabad | Rupineh | Rusta

=== S ===
Sadeqabad | Safaabad | Safiabad | Safidar | Sahlabad | Sakht-e Sardasht | Sakiabad | Salah Chin | Salehabad-e Zari | Salehat | Salm | Salmanak-e Olya | Salmanak-e Sofla | Saman | Samsami | Sandejan-e Olya | Sandejan-e Sofla | Sangchin | Sang-e Bil | Sar Aqa Seyyed | Sar Bisheh | Sar Boneh | Sar Chah | Sar Kamar | Sar Khun | Sar Mazeh | Sar Mur | Sar Pir | Sar Pir | Sar Qaleh | Sar Qaleh | Sar Qaleh | Sar Saleh Kutah | Sar Tang | Sar Tang-e Mahmud | Sar Tang-e Mesen | Sardar | Sardarabad | Sarput | Sarrak | Sarreh Zard | Sartang-e Badam Shirin | Sartang-e Dinar Ali | Sarteshniz | Sarveh-ye Pain | Sarz-e Gah | Savad Jan | Sefiddasht | Seh Juy | Sena Jan | Sepid Daneh | Sevah | Seyfabad | Seyfabad | Seyfabad-e Allah Yar | Seyl Gah | Seyyed Mohammad | Shah Abd ol Azim | Shah Hoseyni | Shah Najaf | Shah Qaryeh | Shahrak-e 12 Emam | Shahrak-e Baraftab-e Shirani | Shahrak-e Barreh Mordeh | Shahrak-e Chebd | Shahrak-e Chelow | Shahrak-e Durak | Shahrak-e Emam Hoseyn | Shahrak-e Emam Khomeyni | Shahrak-e Galu Gerd | Shahrak-e Gel Sefid | Shahrak-e Gholamabad | Shahrak-e Kazamiyeh | Shahrak-e Kuranabad | Shahrak-e Kushka | Shahrak-e Mamasani | Shahrak-e Mamur | Shahrak-e Mashk Duzan | Shahrak-e Mazeh Sukhteh | Shahrak-e Miheh | Shahrak-e Mohammadi | Shahrak-e Nur | Shahrak-e Qarab | Shahrak-e Rahberi | Shahrak-e Shahid Emami | Shahrak-e Shiasi | Shahrak-e Sunk | Shahrak-e Zeverdegan | Shahrekord | Shahriar | Shahriari | Shahsavar | Shakarteh | Shalamzar | Shalil-e Olya | Shalil-e Sofla | Shamlek | Shamsabad | Sharifabad | Sharmak | Shekarabad | Shesh Bahreh-ye Mianeh | Shesh Bahreh-ye Olya | Shesh Bahreh-ye Sofla | Sheydan | Sheykh Ali Khan | Sheykh Ali | Sheykh Mahmud | Sheykh Shaban | Shir Mard | Shokrabad | Shovar | Shuleh | Shur Ab | Shurab-e Kabir | Shurab-e Saghir | Shuran | Shush | Sibak | Sileh | Sini | Sirak | Siyavashabad-e Chendar | Siyavashabad-e Gerdu | Soltanabad | Soltani | Sudjan | Sugar Factory | Sulgan | Sur Mandeh | Sureshjan | Surk

=== T ===
Tabarak-e Olya | Tabarak-e Sofla | Tagarg Ab | Talayeh | Talineh-ye Dudera | Talkhehdan | Tall Eshgafti | Tall Maran | Tall Tak | Talu | Tang Kolureh | Tangarak | Tang-e Huni | Taqanak | Taram | Tavalledan | Telurd | Tepa-ye Olya | Tepa-ye Sofla | Tereki | Teshnavi | Teshniz | Teyak | Tir Saman | Tumanak

=== U ===
Uch Boghaz

=== V ===
Vanan | Vaqfi | Vardanjan | Var-e Zard | Varkohleh | Vastegan | Vaz-e Gagangarestan | Veysabad

=== Y ===
Yan Cheshmeh | Yaseh Chah | Yavarabad | Yunaki | Yurd Sukhteh | Yusefabad

=== Z ===
Zamanabad | Zarak | Zardlimeh | Zarmitan | Zarrin Derakht | Zeyti-ye Do | Zeyti-ye Seh |
