= Chevilan =

Chevilan چويلان
- Village
- Location within Iran
- Coordinates: 32°01′13″N 50°19′06″E
- Country: Iran
- Province: Chaharmahal and Bakhtiari
- County: Ardal
- Bakhsh: Central
- Rural District: Dinaran

Population (2006)
  - Total: 92
- Time zone: UTC+3:30 (IRST)
  - Summer (DST): UTC+4:30 (IRDT)

Chevilan (Persian: چويلان, also Romanized as Chevīlān) is a village in Dinaran Rural District, in the Central District of Ardal County, Chaharmahal and Bakhtiari Province, Iran. At the 2006 census, its population was 92, in 18 families. The village is populated by Lurs.
