= Safaabad =

Safaabad صفااباد
- Village
- Location within Iran
- Coordinates: 32°08′13″N 50°25′38″E
- Country: Iran
- Province: Chaharmahal and Bakhtiari
- County: Kuhrang
- Bakhsh: Bazoft
- Rural District: Doab

Population (2006)
  - Total: 254
- Time zone: UTC+3:30 (IRST)
  - Summer (DST): UTC+4:30 (IRDT)

Safaabad (Persian: صفااباد, also Romanized as Şafāābād) is a village in Doab Rural District, Bazoft District, Kuhrang County, Chaharmahal and Bakhtiari Province, Iran. At the 2006 census, its population was 254, in 44 families. The village is populated by Lurs.
