= Kalvari-ye Olya =

Kalvari-ye Olya كلواري عليا
- Village
- Location within Iran
- Coordinates: 31°17′38″N 51°13′55″E
- Country: Iran
- Province: Chaharmahal and Bakhtiari
- County: Lordegan
- Bakhsh: Falard
- Rural District: Falard

Population (2006)
  - Total: 449
- Time zone: UTC+3:30 (IRST)
  - Summer (DST): UTC+4:30 (IRDT)

Kalvari-ye Olya (Persian: كلواري عليا, also Romanized as Kalvārī-ye ‘Olyā) is a village in Falard Rural District, Falard District, Lordegan County, Chaharmahal and Bakhtiari Province, Iran. At the 2006 census, its population was 449, in 85 families. The village is populated by Lurs.
