= Sakiabad =

Sakiabad ساكي اباد
- Village
- Location within Iran
- Coordinates: 31°54′13″N 50°53′03″E
- Country: Iran
- Province: Chaharmahal and Bakhtiari
- County: Borujen
- Bakhsh: Boldaji
- Rural District: Chaghakhor

Population (2006)
  - Total: 144
- Time zone: UTC+3:30 (IRST)
  - Summer (DST): UTC+4:30 (IRDT)

Sakiabad (Persian: ساكي اباد, also Romanized as Sākīābād) is a village in Chaghakhor Rural District, Boldaji District, Borujen County, Chaharmahal and Bakhtiari Province, Iran. At the 2006 census, its population was 144, in 25 families. The village is populated by Lurs.
