= Galamtin =

Galamtin گلمتين
- Village
- Country: Iran
- Province: Chaharmahal and Bakhtiari
- County: Lordegan
- Bakhsh: Central
- Rural District: Sardasht

Population (2006)
  - Total: 25
- Time zone: UTC+3:30 (IRST)
  - Summer (DST): UTC+4:30 (IRDT)

Galamtin (Persian: گلمتين, also Romanized as Galamtīn) is a village in Sardasht Rural District, in the Central District of Lordegan County, Chaharmahal and Bakhtiari Province, Iran. At the 2006 census, its population was 25, in 5 families.
