= Kesri =

Coordinates: 33.0333°N 50.1500°E

Kesri كسري
- Village
- Interactive map of Kesri
- Country: Iran
- Province: Chaharmahal and Bakhtiari
- County: Kuhrang
- Bakhsh: Bazoft
- Rural District: Bazoft

Population (2006)
  - Total: 43
- Time zone: UTC+3:30 (IRST)
  - Summer (DST): UTC+4:30 (IRDT)

Kesri (Persian: كسري, also Romanized as Kesrī) is a village in Bazoft Rural District, Bazoft District, Kuhrang County, Chaharmahal and Bakhtiari Province, Iran. At the 2006 census, its population was 43, in 7 families. The village is populated by Lurs.
