= Darreh Niyak =

Darreh Niyak دره نيك
- Village
- Location within Iran
- Coordinates: 31°11′05″N 51°09′28″E
- Country: Iran
- Province: Chaharmahal and Bakhtiari
- County: Lordegan
- Bakhsh: Falard
- Rural District: Poshtkuh

Population (2006)
  - Total: 227
- Time zone: UTC+3:30 (IRST)
  - Summer (DST): UTC+4:30 (IRDT)

Darreh Niyak (Persian: دره نيك, also Romanized as Darreh Nīyak, Darreh Neyak, and Darreh Nīāk) is a village in Poshtkuh Rural District, Falard District, Lordegan County, Chaharmahal and Bakhtiari Province, Iran. At the 2006 census, its population was 227, in 55 families. The village is populated by Lurs.
