= Qobadabad =

Qobadabad قباداباد
- Village
- Location within Iran
- Coordinates: 32°24′11″N 50°16′56″E
- Country: Iran
- Province: Chaharmahal and Bakhtiari
- County: Kuhrang
- Bakhsh: Central
- Rural District: Dasht-e Zarrin

Population (2006)
  - Total: 265
- Time zone: UTC+3:30 (IRST)
  - Summer (DST): UTC+4:30 (IRDT)

Qobadabad (Persian: قباداباد, also Romanized as Qobādābād) is a village in Dasht-e Zarrin Rural District, in the Central District of Kuhrang County, Chaharmahal and Bakhtiari Province, Iran. At the 2006 census, its population was 265, in 47 families. The village is populated by Lurs.
