= Nargili =

Nargili نارگيلي
- Village
- Location within Iran
- Coordinates: 31°10′18″N 51°08′39″E
- Country: Iran
- Province: Chaharmahal and Bakhtiari
- County: Lordegan
- Bakhsh: Falard
- Rural District: Poshtkuh

Population (2006)
  - Total: 126
- Time zone: UTC+3:30 (IRST)
  - Summer (DST): UTC+4:30 (IRDT)

Nargili (Persian: نارگيلي, also Romanized as Nārgīlī) is a village in Poshtkuh Rural District, Falard District, Lordegan County, Chaharmahal and Bakhtiari Province, Iran. At the 2006 census, its population was 126, in 26 families. The village is populated by Lurs.
