= Duruzanabad =

Duruzanabad دوروزن اباد
- Village
- Location within Iran
- Coordinates: 32°19′40″N 50°13′15″E
- Country: Iran
- Province: Chaharmahal and Bakhtiari
- County: Kuhrang
- Bakhsh: Central
- Rural District: Shurab-e Tangazi

Population (2006)
  - Total: 56
- Time zone: UTC+3:30 (IRST)
  - Summer (DST): UTC+4:30 (IRDT)

Duruzanabad (Persian: دوروزن اباد, also Romanized as Dūrūzanābād; also known as Dorūzanābād and Dorūzūnābād) is a village in Shurab-e Tangazi Rural District, in the Central District of Kuhrang County, Chaharmahal and Bakhtiari Province, Iran. At the 2006 census, its population was 56, in 11 families. The village is populated by Lurs.
