= Gangarestan =

Coordinates: 32°11′N 50°06′E

Gangarestan گنگرستان
- Village
- Interactive map of Gangarestan
- Country: Iran
- Province: Chaharmahal and Bakhtiari
- County: Kuhrang
- Bakhsh: Bazoft
- Rural District: Doab

Population (2006)
  - Total: 51
- Time zone: UTC+3:30 (IRST)
  - Summer (DST): UTC+4:30 (IRDT)

Gangarestan (Persian: گنگرستان, also Romanized as Gangarestān) is a village in Doab Rural District, Bazoft District, Kuhrang County, Chaharmahal and Bakhtiari Province, Iran. At the 2006 census, its population was 51, in 10 families. The village is populated by Lurs.
