= Chal Chendar =

Chal Chendar چال چندار
- Village
- Location within Iran
- Coordinates: 31°29′30″N 50°30′13″E
- Country: Iran
- Province: Chaharmahal and Bakhtiari
- County: Lordegan
- Bakhsh: Manj
- Rural District: Barez

Population (2006)
  - Total: 196
- Time zone: UTC+3:30 (IRST)
  - Summer (DST): UTC+4:30 (IRDT)

Chal Chendar (Persian: چال چندار, also Romanized as Chāl Chendār and Chāl-e Chenār) is a village in Barez Rural District, Manj District, Lordegan County, Chaharmahal and Bakhtiari Province, Iran. At the 2006 census, its population was 196, in 46 families.
