= Darreh Zargeh =

Darreh Zargeh دره زرگه
- Village
- Location within Iran
- Coordinates: 32°38′18″N 49°58′16″E
- Country: Iran
- Province: Chaharmahal and Bakhtiari
- County: Kuhrang
- Bakhsh: Central
- Rural District: Miankuh-e Moguyi

Population (2006)
  - Total: 52
- Time zone: UTC+3:30 (IRST)
  - Summer (DST): UTC+4:30 (IRDT)

Darreh Zargeh (Persian: دره زرگه; also known as Dar Zargeh and Zargāh Darreh) is a village in Miankuh-e Moguyi Rural District, in the Central District of Kuhrang County, Chaharmahal and Bakhtiari Province, Iran. At the 2006 census, its population was 52, in 10 families. The village is populated by Lurs.
