= Var-e Zard =

Var-e Zard ورزرد
- Village
- Location within Iran
- Coordinates: 31°43′40″N 50°34′25″E
- Country: Iran
- Province: Chaharmahal and Bakhtiari
- County: Ardal
- Bakhsh: Miankuh
- Rural District: Miankuh

Population (2006)
  - Total: 445
- Time zone: UTC+3:30 (IRST)
  - Summer (DST): UTC+4:30 (IRDT)

Var-e Zard (Persian: ورزرد) is a village in Miankuh Rural District, Miankuh District, Ardal County, Chaharmahal and Bakhtiari Province, Iran. At the 2006 census, its population was 445, in 94 families. The village is populated by Lurs.
