= Shah Hoseyni =

Shah Hoseyni شاه حسيني
- Village
- Location within Iran
- Coordinates: 31°25′04″N 50°40′57″E
- Country: Iran
- Province: Chaharmahal and Bakhtiari
- County: Lordegan
- Bakhsh: Central
- Rural District: Milas

Population (2006)
  - Total: 43
- Time zone: UTC+3:30 (IRST)
  - Summer (DST): UTC+4:30 (IRDT)

Shah Hoseyni (Persian: شاه حسيني, also Romanized as Shāh Ḩoseynī) is a village in Milas Rural District, in the Central District of Lordegan County, Chaharmahal and Bakhtiari Province, Iran. At the 2006 census, its population was 43, in 11 families.
