= Qaleh Barez =

Village in Chaharmahal and Bakhtiari, Iran

Qaleh Barez قلعه بارز
- Village
- Location within Iran
- Coordinates: 31°30′57″N 50°24′10″E
- Country: Iran
- Province: Chaharmahal and Bakhtiari
- County: Lordegan
- Bakhsh: Manj
- Rural District: Barez

Population (2006)
  - Total: 15
- Time zone: UTC+3:30 (IRST)
  - Summer (DST): UTC+4:30 (IRDT)

Qaleh Barez (Persian: قلعه بارز, also Romanized as Qal‘eh Bārez) is a village in Barez Rural District, Manj District, Lordegan County, Chaharmahal and Bakhtiari Province, Iran. At the 2006 census, its population was 15, in 4 families.
