= Qaleh-ye Eqbal =

Qaleh-ye Eqbal قلعه اقبال
- Village
- Country: Iran
- Province: Chaharmahal and Bakhtiari
- County: Farsan
- Bakhsh: Central
- Rural District: Mizdej-e Olya

Population (2006)
  - Total: 40
- Time zone: UTC+3:30 (IRST)
  - Summer (DST): UTC+4:30 (IRDT)

Qaleh-ye Eqbal (Persian: قلعه اقبال, also Romanized as Qal‘eh-ye Eqbāl) is a village in Mizdej-e Olya Rural District, in the Central District of Farsan County, Chaharmahal and Bakhtiari Province, Iran. At the 2006 census, its population was 40, in 8 families. The village is populated by Lurs.
