= Kufi, Iran =

Kufi كوفي
- village
- Location within Iran
- Coordinates: 32°11′19″N 50°16′25″E
- Country: Iran
- Province: Chaharmahal and Bakhtiari
- County: Kuhrang
- Bakhsh: Bazoft
- Rural District: Doab

Population (2006)
  - Total: 62
- Time zone: UTC+3:30 (IRST)
  - Summer (DST): UTC+4:30 (IRDT)
- ISO 3166 code: IRN

Kufi (Persian: كوفي, also Romanized as Kūfī) is a village in Doab Rural District, Bazoft District, Kuhrang County, Chaharmahal and Bakhtiari Province, Iran. At the 2006 census, its population was 62, in 10 families. The village is populated by Lurs.
