= Godar-e Kabk =

Godar-e Kabk گداركبك
- Village
- Location within Iran
- Coordinates: 31°42′33″N 51°15′12″E
- Country: Iran
- Province: Chaharmahal and Bakhtiari
- County: Borujen
- Bakhsh: Gandoman
- Rural District: Dowrahan

Population (2006)
  - Total: 140
- Time zone: UTC+3:30 (IRST)
  - Summer (DST): UTC+4:30 (IRDT)

Godar-e Kabk (Persian: گداركبك, also Romanized as Godār-e Kabk) is a village in Dowrahan Rural District, Gandoman District, Borujen County, Chaharmahal and Bakhtiari Province, Iran. At the 2006 census, its population was 140, in 31 families. The village is populated by Lurs.

== See also ==
- Gudar people
