= Kahidan =

Kahidan كاهيدان
- Village
- Location within Iran
- Coordinates: 31°42′06″N 50°36′14″E
- Country: Iran
- Province: Chaharmahal and Bakhtiari
- County: Ardal
- Bakhsh: Miankuh
- Rural District: Miankuh

Population (2006)
  - Total: 248
- Time zone: UTC+3:30 (IRST)
  - Summer (DST): UTC+4:30 (IRDT)

Kahidan (Persian: كاهيدان, also Romanized as Kāhīdān; also known as Kāhīdān-e Gharīb Shāhī and Kāhīdān-e Qarīb Shāhī) is a village in Miankuh Rural District, Miankuh District, Ardal County, Chaharmahal and Bakhtiari Province, Iran. At the 2006 census, its population was 248, in 51 families. The village is populated by Lurs.
