= Cheshmeh Choli =

Cheshmeh Choli چشمه چلي
- Village
- Location within Iran
- Coordinates: 32°25′24″N 50°20′39″E
- Country: Iran
- Province: Chaharmahal and Bakhtiari
- County: Kuhrang
- Bakhsh: Central
- Rural District: Dasht-e Zarrin

Population (2006)
  - Total: 29
- Time zone: UTC+3:30 (IRST)
  - Summer (DST): UTC+4:30 (IRDT)

Cheshmeh Choli (Persian: چشمه چلي, also Romanized as Cheshmeh Cholī and Cheshmeh Chelī; also known as Cheshmeh Chowlī) is a village in Dasht-e Zarrin Rural District, in the Central District of Kuhrang County, Chaharmahal and Bakhtiari Province, Iran. At the 2006 census, its population was 29, in 8 families. The village is populated by Lurs.
