= Darreh Yas =

Village in Chaharmahal and Bakhtiari Province, Iran

Darreh Yas دره ياس
- Village
- Location within Iran
- Coordinates: 31°56′00″N 50°31′00″E
- Country: Iran
- Province: Chaharmahal and Bakhtiari
- County: Kiar
- Bakhsh: Naghan
- Rural District: Mashayekh

Population (2006)
  - Total: 329
- Time zone: UTC+3:30 (IRST)
  - Summer (DST): UTC+4:30 (IRDT)

Darreh Yas (Persian: دره ياس, also Romanized as Darreh Yās; also known as Rūd Vār and Rūdwār) is a village in Mashayekh Rural District, Naghan District, Kiar County, Chaharmahal and Bakhtiari Province, Iran. At the 2006 census, its population was 329, in 76 families.
