= Mownowm =

Mownowm مونوم
- Village
- Location within Iran
- Coordinates: 31°12′58″N 51°01′19″E
- Country: Iran
- Province: Chaharmahal and Bakhtiari
- County: Lordegan
- Bakhsh: Central
- Rural District: Sardasht

Population (2006)
  - Total: 41
- Time zone: UTC+3:30 (IRST)
  - Summer (DST): UTC+4:30 (IRDT)

Mownowm (Persian: مونوم; also known as Mownow) is a village in Sardasht Rural District, in the Central District of Lordegan County, Chaharmahal and Bakhtiari Province, Iran. At the 2006 census, its population was 41, in 6 families. The village is populated by Lurs.
