= Shurab-e Kabir =

Village in Chaharmahal and Bakhtiari, Iran

Shurab-e Kabir شوراب كبير
- Village
- Location within Iran
- Coordinates: 32°30′22″N 50°59′08″E
- Country: Iran
- Province: Chaharmahal and Bakhtiari
- County: Saman
- Rural District: Saman

Population (2006)
  - Total: 438
- Time zone: UTC+3:30 (IRST)
  - Summer (DST): UTC+4:30 (IRDT)

Shurab-e Kabir (Persian: شوراب كبير, also Romanized as Shūrāb-e Kabīr) is a village in Saman Rural District, Saman County, Chaharmahal and Bakhtiari Province, Iran. At the 2006 census, its population was 438, in 109 families. The village is populated by Persians.
