= Ab-e Gelur =

Ab-e Gelur ابگلور
- Village
- Location within Iran
- Coordinates: 31°50′54″N 50°35′48″E
- Country: Iran
- Province: Chaharmahal and Bakhtiari
- County: Kiar
- Bakhsh: Naghan
- Rural District: Mashayekh

Area
  - Total: 1 km^{2} (0.39 sq mi)

Population (1948)
  - Total: 42
  - Density: 42/km^{2} (110/sq mi)
- Time zone: UTC+3:30 (IRST)
  - Summer (DST): UTC+4:30 (IRDT)

Ab-e Gelur (Persian: ابگلور, also Romanized as Āb-e Gelūr and Āb Galūr; also known as Āb Galū) is a village in Mashayekh Rural District, Naghan District, Kiar County, Chaharmahal and Bakhtiari province, Iran. At the 2006 census, its population was 42, in 10 families. The village is populated by Lurs.
