= Sar Boneh =

Sar Boneh سربنه
- Village
- Location within Iran
- Coordinates: 31°42′07″N 50°36′07″E
- Country: Iran
- Province: Chaharmahal and Bakhtiari
- County: Ardal
- Bakhsh: Miankuh
- Rural District: Miankuh

Population (2006)
  - Total: 143
- Time zone: UTC+3:30 (IRST)
  - Summer (DST): UTC+4:30 (IRDT)

Sar Boneh (Persian: سربنه) is a village in Miankuh Rural District, Miankuh District, Ardal County, Chaharmahal and Bakhtiari Province, Iran. At the 2006 census, its population was 143, in 31 families. The village is populated by Lurs.
