= Dehzir-e Dudera =

Dehzir-e Dudera ده زيردودرائ
- Village
- Location within Iran
- Coordinates: 31°18′03″N 50°50′14″E
- Country: Iran
- Province: Chaharmahal and Bakhtiari
- County: Lordegan
- Bakhsh: Central
- Rural District: Sardasht

Population (2006)
  - Total: 195
- Time zone: UTC+3:30 (IRST)
  - Summer (DST): UTC+4:30 (IRDT)

Dehzir-e Dudera (Persian: ده زيردودرائ, also Romanized as Dehzīr-e Dūderā’) is a village in Sardasht Rural District, in the Central District of Lordegan County, Chaharmahal and Bakhtiari Province, Iran. At the 2006 census, its population was 195, in 23 families. The village is populated by Lurs.
