= Dehgeh-ye Shah Mansuri =

Dehgeh-ye Shah Mansuri ده گه شامنصوري
- Village
- Location within Iran
- Coordinates: 32°13′05″N 50°14′20″E
- Country: Iran
- Province: Chaharmahal and Bakhtiari
- County: Kuhrang
- Bakhsh: Bazoft
- Rural District: Doab

Population (2006)
  - Total: 99
- Time zone: UTC+3:30 (IRST)
  - Summer (DST): UTC+4:30 (IRDT)

Dehgeh-ye Shah Mansuri (Persian: ده گه شامنصوري, also Romanized as Dehgeh-ye Shāh Manşūrī) is a village in Doab Rural District, Bazoft District, Kuhrang County, Chaharmahal and Bakhtiari Province, Iran. At the 2006 census, its population was 99, in 18 families. The village is populated by Lurs.
