= Qaleh-ye Kashgi =

Qaleh-ye Kashgi قلعه كشگي
- Village
- Location within Iran
- Coordinates: 32°00′18″N 50°11′45″E
- Country: Iran
- Province: Chaharmahal and Bakhtiari
- County: Kuhrang
- Bakhsh: Bazoft
- Rural District: Doab

Population (2006)
  - Total: 42
- Time zone: UTC+3:30 (IRST)
  - Summer (DST): UTC+4:30 (IRDT)

Qaleh-ye Kashgi (Persian: قلعه كشگي, also Romanized as Qal‘eh-ye Kashgī; also known as Qal‘eh-ye Kashkī) is a village in Doab Rural District, Bazoft District, Kuhrang County, Chaharmahal and Bakhtiari Province, Iran. At the 2006 census, its population was 42, in 5 families. The village is populated by Lurs.
