= Nokhodkar =

Nokhvodkar نخودكار
- Village
- Location within Iran
- Coordinates: 31°19′08″N 50°51′05″E
- Country: Iran
- Province: Chaharmahal and Bakhtiari
- County: Lordegan
- Bakhsh: Central
- Rural District: Sardasht

Population (2006)
  - Total: 61
- Time zone: UTC+3:30 (IRST)
  - Summer (DST): UTC+4:30 (IRDT)

Nokhvodkar (Persian: نخودكار, also Romanized as Nokhvodkār) is a village in Sardasht Rural District, in the Central District of Lordegan County, Chaharmahal and Bakhtiari Province, Iran. At the 2006 census, its population was 61, in 11 families. The village is populated by Lurs.
