= Sarput =

Sarput سرپوت
- Village
- Country: Iran
- Province: Chaharmahal and Bakhtiari
- County: Lordegan
- Bakhsh: Central
- Rural District: Milas

Population (2006)
  - Total: 87
- Time zone: UTC+3:30 (IRST)
  - Summer (DST): UTC+4:30 (IRDT)

Sarput (Persian: سرپوت, also Romanized as Sarpūt) is a village in Milas Rural District, Central District, Lordegan County, Chaharmahal and Bakhtiari Province, Iran. At the 2006 census, its population was 87, in 15 families.
