= Kuy-e Shahid Beheshti =

Kuy-e Shahid Beheshti كوي شهيدبهشتي
- Village
- Location within Iran
- Coordinates: 32°27′11″N 50°08′28″E
- Country: Iran
- Province: Chaharmahal and Bakhtiari
- County: Kuhrang
- Bakhsh: Central
- Rural District: Shurab-e Tangazi

Population (2006)
  - Total: 247
- Time zone: UTC+3:30 (IRST)
  - Summer (DST): UTC+4:30 (IRDT)

Kuy-e Shahid Beheshti (Persian: كوي شهيدبهشتي, also Romanized as Kūy-e Shahīd Beheshtī; also known as Rūstā-ye Shahīd Beheshtī) is a village in Shurab-e Tangazi Rural District, in the Central District of Kuhrang County, Chaharmahal and Bakhtiari Province, Iran. At the 2006 census, its population was 247, in 39 families. The village is populated by Lurs.
