= Malek Shir =

Malek Shir ملكشير
- Village
- Location within Iran
- Coordinates: 31°43′16″N 50°34′16″E
- Country: Iran
- Province: Chaharmahal and Bakhtiari
- County: Ardal
- Bakhsh: Miankuh
- Rural District: Miankuh

Population (2006)
  - Total: 549
- Time zone: UTC+3:30 (IRST)
  - Summer (DST): UTC+4:30 (IRDT)

Malek Shir (Persian: ملكشير, also romanized as Malek Shīr) is a village in Miankuh Rural District, Miankuh District, Ardal County, Chaharmahal and Bakhtiari Province, Iran. At the 2006 census, its population was 549, in 118 families. The village is populated by Lurs.
