= Chalku =

Chalku چالكو
- Village
- Location within Iran
- Coordinates: 31°23′04″N 50°50′01″E
- Country: Iran
- Province: Chaharmahal and Bakhtiari
- County: Lordegan
- Bakhsh: Central
- Rural District: Sardasht

Population (2006)
  - Total: 500
- Time zone: UTC+3:30 (IRST)
  - Summer (DST): UTC+4:30 (IRDT)

Chalku (Persian: چالكو, also Romanized as Chālkū) is a village in Sardasht Rural District, in the Central District of Lordegan County, Chaharmahal and Bakhtiari Province, Iran. At the 2006 census, its population was 500, in 92 families.
