= Qaleh-ye Tabarak =

Village in Chaharmahal and Bakhtiari, Iran

Qaleh-ye Tabarak قلعه تبرك
- Village
- Location within Iran
- Coordinates: 32°11′10″N 50°02′01″E
- Country: Iran
- Province: Chaharmahal and Bakhtiari
- County: Kuhrang
- Bakhsh: Bazoft
- Rural District: Bazoft

Population (2006)
  - Total: 109
- Time zone: UTC+3:30 (IRST)
  - Summer (DST): UTC+4:30 (IRDT)

Qaleh-ye Tabarak (Persian: قلعه تبرك, also Romanized as Qal‘eh-ye Tabarak and Qal‘eh-ye Tabārok) is a village in Bazoft Rural District, Bazoft District, Kuhrang County, Chaharmahal and Bakhtiari Province, Iran. At the 2006 census, its population was 109, in 17 families. The village is populated by Lurs.
