= Kanemi =

Kanemi كنمي
- Village
- Location within Iran
- Coordinates: 31°42′33″N 50°36′02″E
- Country: Iran
- Province: Chaharmahal and Bakhtiari
- County: Ardal
- Bakhsh: Miankuh
- Rural District: Miankuh

Population (2006)
  - Total: 318
- Time zone: UTC+3:30 (IRST)
  - Summer (DST): UTC+4:30 (IRDT)

Kanemi (Persian: كنمي, also romanized as Kanemī; also known as Kanehmī) is a village in Miankuh Rural District, Miankuh District, Ardal County, Chaharmahal and Bakhtiari Province, Iran. At the 2006 census, its population was 318, in 63 families. The village is populated by Lurs.
