= Chamabad =

Chamabad چم اباد
- Village
- Location within Iran
- Coordinates: 32°15′53″N 50°17′41″E
- Country: Iran
- Province: Chaharmahal and Bakhtiari
- County: Kuhrang
- Bakhsh: Central
- Rural District: Shurab-e Tangazi

Population (2006)
  - Total: 11
- Time zone: UTC+3:30 (IRST)
  - Summer (DST): UTC+4:30 (IRDT)

Chamabad (Persian: چم اباد, also Romanized as Chamābād) is a village in Shurab-e Tangazi Rural District, in the Central District of Kuhrang County, Chaharmahal and Bakhtiari Province, Iran. At the 2006 census, its population was 11, in 6 families. The village is populated by Lurs.
