= Chelbardi =

Chelbardi چل بردي
- Village
- Location within Iran
- Coordinates: 31°19′46″N 50°52′22″E
- Country: Iran
- Province: Chaharmahal and Bakhtiari
- County: Lordegan
- Bakhsh: Central
- Rural District: Sardasht

Population (2006)
  - Total: 75
- Time zone: UTC+3:30 (IRST)
  - Summer (DST): UTC+4:30 (IRDT)

Chelbardi (Persian: چل بردي, romanized: Chelbardī), also known as Chelebardī and Chehel Bardeh) is a village in Sardasht Rural District, in the Central District of Lordegan County, Chaharmahal and Bakhtiari Province, Iran. At the 2006 census, it had a population of 75, in 13 families.
