= Darreh Hendu =

Darreh Hendu دره هندو
- Village
- Location within Iran
- Coordinates: 32°16′45″N 49°59′16″E
- Country: Iran
- Province: Chaharmahal and Bakhtiari
- County: Kuhrang
- Bakhsh: Bazoft
- Rural District: Bazoft

Population (2006)
  - Total: 56
- Time zone: UTC+3:30 (IRST)
  - Summer (DST): UTC+4:30 (IRDT)

Darreh Hendu (Persian: دره هندو, also Romanized as Darreh Hendū; also known as Darrehhendū) is a village in Bazoft Rural District, Bazoft District, Kuhrang County, Chaharmahal and Bakhtiari Province, Iran. At the 2006 census, its population was 56, in 12 families. The village is populated by Lurs.
