= Shahrak-e Chebd =

Shahrak-e Chebd شهرك چبد
- Village
- Location within Iran
- Coordinates: 32°27′30″N 49°47′30″E
- Country: Iran
- Province: Chaharmahal and Bakhtiari
- County: Kuhrang
- Bakhsh: Bazoft
- Rural District: Bazoft

Population (2006)
  - Total: 121
- Time zone: UTC+3:30 (IRST)
  - Summer (DST): UTC+4:30 (IRDT)

Shahrak-e Chebd (Persian: شهرك چبد; also known as Chebd) is a village in Bazoft Rural District, Bazoft District, Kuhrang County, Chaharmahal and Bakhtiari Province, Iran. At the 2006 census, its population was 121, in 26 families. The village is populated by Lurs.
