= Qaleh-ye Someh =

Village in Chaharmahal and Bakhtiari, Iran

Qaleh-ye Someh قلعه سمه
- Village
- Location within Iran
- Coordinates: 31°34′50″N 50°35′30″E
- Country: Iran
- Province: Chaharmahal and Bakhtiari
- County: Lordegan
- Bakhsh: Manj
- Rural District: Manj

Population (2006)
  - Total: 158
- Time zone: UTC+3:30 (IRST)
  - Summer (DST): UTC+4:30 (IRDT)

Qaleh-ye Someh (Persian: قلعه سمه, also Romanized as Qal‘eh-ye Someh; also known as Qal‘eh-ye Sowmeh) is a village in Manj Rural District, Manj District, Lordegan County, Chaharmahal and Bakhtiari Province, Iran. At the 2006 census, its population was 158, in 25 families. The village is populated by Lurs.
