= Shahrak-e Shahid Emami =

Shahrak-e Shahid Emami شهرك شهيدامامي
- Village
- Location within Iran
- Coordinates: 31°55′31″N 50°28′23″E
- Country: Iran
- Province: Chaharmahal and Bakhtiari
- County: Ardal
- Bakhsh: Central
- Rural District: Dinaran

Population (2006)
  - Total: 139
- Time zone: UTC+3:30 (IRST)
  - Summer (DST): UTC+4:30 (IRDT)

Shahrak-e Shahid Emami (Persian: شهرك شهيدامامي, also Romanized as Shahrak-e Shahīd Emāmī; also known as Shahīdemāmī) is a village in Dinaran Rural District, in the Central District of Ardal County, Chaharmahal and Bakhtiari Province, Iran. At the 2006 census, its population was 139, in 24 families. The village is populated by Lurs.
