= Tall Eshgafti =

Tall Eshgafti تل اشگفتي
- Village
- Location within Iran
- Coordinates: 31°17′29″N 51°14′09″E
- Country: Iran
- Province: Chaharmahal and Bakhtiari
- County: Lordegan
- Bakhsh: Falard
- Rural District: Falard

Population (2006)
  - Total: 266
- Time zone: UTC+3:30 (IRST)
  - Summer (DST): UTC+4:30 (IRDT)

Tall Eshgafti (Persian: تل اشگفتي, also Romanized as Tall Eshgaftī; also known as Tall Eshkaftan) is a village in Falard Rural District, Falard District, Lordegan County, Chaharmahal and Bakhtiari Province, Iran. At the 2006 census, its population was 266, in 59 families. The village is populated by Lurs.
