= Sarveh-ye Pain =

Sarveh-ye Pain سروه پايين
- Village
- Location within Iran
- Coordinates: 32°08′10″N 50°06′12″E
- Country: Iran
- Province: Chaharmahal and Bakhtiari
- County: Kuhrang
- Bakhsh: Bazoft
- Rural District: Doab

Population (2006)
  - Total: 101
- Time zone: UTC+3:30 (IRST)
  - Summer (DST): UTC+4:30 (IRDT)

Sarveh-ye Pain (Persian: سروه پايين, also Romanized as Sarveh-ye Pā’īn) is a village in Doab Rural District, Bazoft District, Kuhrang County, Chaharmahal and Bakhtiari Province, Iran. At the 2006 census, its population was 101, in 18 families. The village is populated by Lurs.
