= Sar Mazeh =

Sar Mazeh سرمازه
- Village
- Location within Iran
- Coordinates: 31°42′17″N 50°35′59″E
- Country: Iran
- Province: Chaharmahal and Bakhtiari
- County: Ardal
- Bakhsh: Miankuh
- Rural District: Miankuh

Population (2006)
  - Total: 401
- Time zone: UTC+3:30 (IRST)
  - Summer (DST): UTC+4:30 (IRDT)

Sar Mazeh (Persian: سرمازه, also Romanized as Sar Māzeh) is a village in Miankuh Rural District, Miankuh District, Ardal County, Chaharmahal and Bakhtiari Province, Iran. At the 2006 census, its population was 401, in 82 families. The village is populated by Lurs.
