= Kal Gechi =

Kal Gechi كل گچي
- Village
- Location within Iran
- Coordinates: 31°32′41″N 50°48′13″E
- Country: Iran
- Province: Chaharmahal and Bakhtiari
- County: Lordegan
- Bakhsh: Central
- Rural District: Milas

Population (2006)
  - Total: 310
- Time zone: UTC+3:30 (IRST)
  - Summer (DST): UTC+4:30 (IRDT)

Kal Gechi (Persian: كل گچي, also Romanized as Kal Gechī and Kal Gachī; also known as Gol Gachī) is a village in Milas Rural District, in the Central District of Lordegan County, Chaharmahal and Bakhtiari Province, Iran. At the 2006 census, its population was 310, in 61 families.
