= Feryak =

Feryak فريك
- Village
- Location within Iran
- Coordinates: 32°12′49″N 50°01′05″E
- Country: Iran
- Province: Chaharmahal and Bakhtiari
- County: Kuhrang
- Bakhsh: Bazoft
- Rural District: Bazoft

Population (2006)
  - Total: 276
- Time zone: UTC+3:30 (IRST)
  - Summer (DST): UTC+4:30 (IRDT)

Feryak (Persian: فريك) is a village in Bazoft Rural District, Bazoft District, Kuhrang County, Chaharmahal and Bakhtiari Province, Iran.

== Population ==
At the 2006 census, its population was 276, in 43 families. The village is populated by Lurs.
