= Chal Shirin =

Chal Shirin چال شيرين
- Village
- Location within Iran
- Coordinates: 31°23′24″N 50°49′39″E
- Country: Iran
- Province: Chaharmahal and Bakhtiari
- County: Lordegan
- Bakhsh: Central
- Rural District: Sardasht

Population (2006)
  - Total: 329
- Time zone: UTC+3:30 (IRST)
  - Summer (DST): UTC+4:30 (IRDT)

Chal Shirin (Persian: چال شيرين, also Romanized as Chāl Shīrīn) is a village in Sardasht Rural District, in the Central District of Lordegan County, Chaharmahal and Bakhtiari Province, Iran. At the 2006 census, its population was 329, in 53 families.
