= Gavdaneh =

Gavdaneh گاودانه
- Village
- Location within Iran
- Coordinates: 31°32′49″N 50°40′55″E
- Country: Iran
- Province: Chaharmahal and Bakhtiari
- County: Lordegan
- Bakhsh: Manj
- Rural District: Manj

Population (2006)
  - Total: 102
- Time zone: UTC+3:30 (IRST)
  - Summer (DST): UTC+4:30 (IRDT)

Gavdaneh (Persian: گاودانه, also Romanized as Gāvdāneh) is a village in Manj Rural District, Manj District, Lordegan County, Chaharmahal and Bakhtiari Province, Iran. According to the 2006 census, its population was 102, with 21 families. The village is populated by Lurs.
