= Ab Talak =

Village in Iran

Ab Talak اب تلك
- Village
- Country: Iran
- Province: Chaharmahal and Bakhtiari
- County: Lordegan
- Bakhsh: Central
- Rural District: Milas

Population (2006)
  - Total: 30
- Time zone: UTC+3:30 (IRST)
  - Summer (DST): UTC+4:30 (IRDT)

Ab Talak (Persian: اب تلك, also Romanized as Āb Talak) is a village in Milas Rural District, in the Central District of Lordegan County, Chaharmahal and Bakhtiari province, Iran. At the 2006 census, its population was 30, in 7 families.
