= Shahrak-e Qarab =

Shahrak-e Qarab شهرک قراب
- Village
- Location within Iran
- Coordinates: 32°01′15″N 50°23′57″E
- Country: Iran
- Province: Chaharmahal and Bakhtiari
- County: Ardal
- Bakhsh: Central
- Rural District: Dinaran

Population (2006)
  - Total: 330
- Time zone: UTC+3:30 (IRST)
  - Summer (DST): UTC+4:30 (IRDT)

Shahrak-e Qarab (Persian: شهرک قراب, also Romanized as Shahrak-e Qarāb; also known as Maḩdūdeh-ye Shahrak-e Qarāb) is a village in Dinaran Rural District, in the Central District of Ardal County, Chaharmahal and Bakhtiari Province, Iran. At the 2006 census, its population was 330, in 52 families. The village is populated by Lurs.
