= Narmeh-ye Olya =

Narmeh-ye Olya نارمه عليا
- Village
- Location within Iran
- Coordinates: 31°09′57″N 51°09′53″E
- Country: Iran
- Province: Chaharmahal and Bakhtiari
- County: Lordegan
- Bakhsh: Falard
- Rural District: Poshtkuh

Population (2006)
  - Total: 115
- Time zone: UTC+3:30 (IRST)
  - Summer (DST): UTC+4:30 (IRDT)

Narmeh-ye Olya (Persian: نارمه عليا, also Romanized as Nārmeh-ye ‘Olyā) is a village in Poshtkuh Rural District, Falard District, Lordegan County, Chaharmahal and Bakhtiari Province, Iran. At the 2006 census, its population was 115, in 24 families. The village is populated by Lurs.
