= Siyavashabad-e Chendar =

Siyavashabad-e Chendar سياوش‌آباد چندار
- Village
- Location within Iran
- Coordinates: 32°11′02″N 50°18′22″E
- Country: Iran
- Province: Chaharmahal and Bakhtiari
- County: Kuhrang
- Bakhsh: Bazoft
- Rural District: Doab

Population (2006)
  - Total: 169
- Time zone: UTC+3:30 (IRST)
  - Summer (DST): UTC+4:30 (IRDT)

Siyavashabad-e Chendar (Persian: سياوش‌آباد چندار, also Romanized as Sīyāvashābād-e Chendār) is a village in Doab Rural District, Bazoft District, Kuhrang County, Chaharmahal and Bakhtiari Province, Iran. At the 2006 census, its population was 169, in 30 families. The village is populated by Lurs.
