= Milan-e Baba Ahmadi =

Milan-e Baba Ahmadi ميلان بابااحمدي
- Village
- Location within Iran
- Coordinates: 31°18′41″N 51°14′54″E
- Country: Iran
- Province: Chaharmahal and Bakhtiari
- County: Lordegan
- Bakhsh: Falard
- Rural District: Falard

Population (2006)
  - Total: 563
- Time zone: UTC+3:30 (IRST)
  - Summer (DST): UTC+4:30 (IRDT)

Milan-e Baba Ahmadi (Persian: ميلان بابااحمدي, romanized: Mīlān-e Bābā Aḩmadī), also known as Mīlān-e Bābāaḩmadī is a village in Falard Rural District, Falard District, Lordegan County, Chaharmahal and Bakhtiari Province, Iran. At the 2006 census, its population was 563, in 107 families. The village is populated by Lurs.
