= Dehnownadeh =

Dehnownadeh دهنونده
- Village
- Location within Iran
- Coordinates: 32°08′55″N 50°29′48″E
- Country: Iran
- Province: Chaharmahal and Bakhtiari
- County: Ardal
- Bakhsh: Central
- Rural District: Poshtkuh

Population (2006)
  - Total: 462
- Time zone: UTC+3:30 (IRST)
  - Summer (DST): UTC+4:30 (IRDT)

Dehnownadeh (Persian: دهنونده) is a village in Poshtkuh Rural District, in the Central District of Ardal County, Chaharmahal and Bakhtiari Province, Iran. At the 2006 census, its population was 462, in 90 families. The village is populated by Lurs.
