= Tir Saman =

Tir Saman تيرسامان
- Village
- Location within Iran
- Coordinates: 31°34′22″N 50°37′26″E
- Country: Iran
- Province: Chaharmahal and Bakhtiari
- County: Lordegan
- Bakhsh: Manj
- Rural District: Manj

Population (2006)
  - Total: 200
- Time zone: UTC+3:30 (IRST)
  - Summer (DST): UTC+4:30 (IRDT)

Tir Saman (Persian: تيرسامان, also Romanized as Tīr Sāmān) is a village in Manj Rural District, Manj District, Lordegan County, Chaharmahal and Bakhtiari Province, Iran. At the 2006 census, its population was 200, in 33 families. The village is populated by Lurs.
