= Cham-e Nar =

Cham-e Nar چم نار
- Village
- Location within Iran
- Coordinates: 32°27′53″N 50°57′25″E
- Country: Iran
- Province: Chaharmahal and Bakhtiari
- County: Saman
- Rural District: Saman

Population (2006)
  - Total: 230
- Time zone: UTC+3:30 (IRST)
  - Summer (DST): UTC+4:30 (IRDT)

Cham-e Nar (Persian: چم نار, also Romanized as Cham-e Nār and Cham Nār) is a village in Saman Rural District, Saman County, Chaharmahal and Bakhtiari Province, Iran. At the 2006 census, its population was 230, in 67 families. The village is populated by Turkic people.
