= Ab Laran =

Ab Laran ابلاران
- Village
- Location within Iran
- Coordinates: 31°21′16″N 50°45′07″E
- Country: Iran
- Province: Chaharmahal and Bakhtiari
- County: Lordegan
- Bakhsh: Central
- Rural District: Sardasht

Population (2006)
  - Total: 146
- Time zone: UTC+3:30 (IRST)
  - Summer (DST): UTC+4:30 (IRDT)

Ab Laran (Persian: ابلاران, also Romanized as Āb Lārān; also known as Āb Lārūn) is a village in Sardasht Rural District, in the Central District of Lordegan County, Chaharmahal and Bakhtiari province, Iran. At the 2006 census, its population was 146, in 28 families. The village is populated by Lurs.
