= Qaleh-ye Ali Hoseyn Seljuki =

Village in Chaharmahal and Bakhtiari, Iran

Qaleh-ye Ali Hoseyn Seljuki قلعه علي حسين سلجوقي
- Village
- Location within Iran
- Coordinates: 32°27′38″N 50°17′17″E
- Country: Iran
- Province: Chaharmahal and Bakhtiari
- County: Kuhrang
- Bakhsh: Central
- Rural District: Dasht-e Zarrin

Population (2006)
  - Total: 111
- Time zone: UTC+3:30 (IRST)
  - Summer (DST): UTC+4:30 (IRDT)

Qaleh-ye Ali Hoseyn Seljuki (Persian: قلعه علي حسين سلجوقي, also Romanized as Qal‘eh-ye ‘Alī Ḩoseyn Seljūqī; also known as Qal‘eh-ye ‘Alī Ḩoseyn) is a village in Dasht-e Zarrin Rural District, in the Central District of Kuhrang County, Chaharmahal and Bakhtiari Province, Iran. At the 2006 census, its population was 111, in 18 families. The village is populated by Lurs.
