= Faniabad =

Faniabad فاني اباد
- Village
- Location within Iran
- Coordinates: 32°30′43″N 50°09′50″E
- Country: Iran
- Province: Chaharmahal and Bakhtiari
- County: Kuhrang
- Bakhsh: Central
- Rural District: Shurab-e Tangazi

Population (2006)
  - Total: 112
- Time zone: UTC+3:30 (IRST)
  - Summer (DST): UTC+4:30 (IRDT)

Faniabad (Persian: فاني اباد, also Romanized as Fānīābād) is a village in Shurab-e Tangazi Rural District, in the Central District of Kuhrang County, Chaharmahal and Bakhtiari Province, Iran. At the 2006 census, its population was 112, in 26 families. The village is populated by Lurs.
