= Mashg Duzan =

Mashg Duzan مشگدوزان
- Village
- Location within Iran
- Coordinates: 31°33′04″N 50°36′58″E
- Country: Iran
- Province: Chaharmahal and Bakhtiari
- County: Lordegan
- Bakhsh: Manj
- Rural District: Manj

Population (2006)
  - Total: 299
- Time zone: UTC+3:30 (IRST)
  - Summer (DST): UTC+4:30 (IRDT)

Mashg Duzan (Persian: مشگدوزان, also Romanized as Mashg Dūzān; also known as Mashk Dūzān and Moshg Doozan) is a village in Manj Rural District, Manj District, Lordegan County, Chaharmahal and Bakhtiari Province, Iran. At the 2006 census, its population was 299, in 50 families. The village is populated by Lurs.
