= Kachuz =

Kachuz كچوز
- Village
- Location within Iran
- Coordinates: 32°15′47″N 49°58′14″E
- Country: Iran
- Province: Chaharmahal and Bakhtiari
- County: Kuhrang
- Bakhsh: Bazoft
- Rural District: Bazoft

Population (2006)
  - Total: 89
- Time zone: UTC+3:30 (IRST)
  - Summer (DST): UTC+4:30 (IRDT)

Kachuz (Persian: كچوز, also Romanized as Kachūz; also known as Gachūz) is a village in Bazoft Rural District, Bazoft District, Kuhrang County, Chaharmahal and Bakhtiari Province, Iran. At the 2006 census, its population was 89, in 14 families. The village is populated by Lurs.
