= Qaleh-ye Shah Vali Shahid Rajayi =

Qaleh-ye Shah Vali Shahid Rajayi قلعه شاه ولي شهيدرجائي
- Village
- Country: Iran
- Province: Chaharmahal and Bakhtiari
- County: Lordegan
- Bakhsh: Central
- Rural District: Rig

Population (2006)
  - Total: 59
- Time zone: UTC+3:30 (IRST)
  - Summer (DST): UTC+4:30 (IRDT)

Qaleh-ye Shah Vali Shahid Rajayi (Persian: قلعه شاه ولي شهيدرجائي, also Romanized as Qal‘eh-ye Shāh Valī Shahīd Rajāyī) is a village in Rig Rural District, in the Central District of Lordegan County, Chaharmahal and Bakhtiari Province, Iran. At the 2006 census, its population was 59, in 13 families.
