= Gav Shir =

Gav Shir گاوشير
- Village
- Location within Iran
- Coordinates: 32°03′00″N 50°08′24″E
- Country: Iran
- Province: Chaharmahal and Bakhtiari
- County: Kuhrang
- Bakhsh: Bazoft
- Rural District: Doab

Population (2006)
  - Total: 45
- Time zone: UTC+3:30 (IRST)
  - Summer (DST): UTC+4:30 (IRDT)

Gav Shir (Persian: گاوشير, also Romanized as Gāv Shīr) is a village in Doab Rural District, Bazoft District, Kuhrang County, Chaharmahal and Bakhtiari Province, Iran. At the 2006 census, its population was 45, in 7 families. The village is populated by Lurs.
