= Niakan =

Niakan نياكان
- Village
- Location within Iran
- Coordinates: 32°33′34″N 50°08′05″E
- Country: Iran
- Province: Chaharmahal and Bakhtiari
- County: Kuhrang
- Bakhsh: Central
- Rural District: Shurab-e Tangazi

Population (2006)
  - Total: 103
- Time zone: UTC+3:30 (IRST)
  - Summer (DST): UTC+4:30 (IRDT)

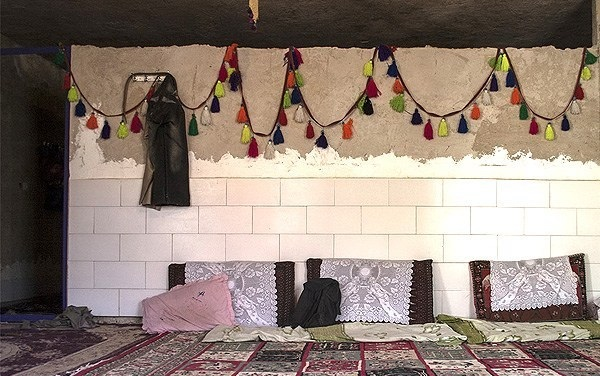

Niakan (Persian: نياكان, also Romanized as Nīākān, Neyākān, and Nīyākān; also known as Nīyagan) is a village in Shurab-e Tangazi Rural District, in the Central District of Kuhrang County, Chaharmahal and Bakhtiari Province, Iran. At the 2006 census, its population was 103, in 22 families. The village is populated by Lurs.
