= Gavzalak =

Gavzalak گوزلك
- Village
- Location within Iran
- Coordinates: 31°47′06″N 50°22′12″E
- Country: Iran
- Province: Chaharmahal and Bakhtiari
- County: Ardal
- Bakhsh: Miankuh
- Rural District: Shalil

Population (2006)
  - Total: 467
- Time zone: UTC+3:30 (IRST)
  - Summer (DST): UTC+4:30 (IRDT)

Gavzalak (Persian: گوزلك, also Romanized as Gāvzalak; also known as Gāzīvalak and Gāzīvlak) is a village in Shalil Rural District, Miankuh District, Ardal County, Chaharmahal and Bakhtiari Province, Iran. At the 2006 census, its population was 467, in 74 families. The village is populated by Lurs.
