= Inekak =

Inekak اينكك
- Village
- Location within Iran
- Coordinates: 31°16′25″N 50°58′14″E
- Country: Iran
- Province: Chaharmahal and Bakhtiari
- County: Lordegan
- Bakhsh: Central
- Rural District: Sardasht

Population (2006)
  - Total: 153
- Time zone: UTC+3:30 (IRST)
  - Summer (DST): UTC+4:30 (IRDT)

Inekak (Persian: اينكك, also Romanized as Īnekak and Īnekek; also known as Enekek and Engak) is a village in Sardasht Rural District, in the Central District of Lordegan County, Chaharmahal and Bakhtiari Province, Iran. At the 2006 census, its population was 153, in 23 families. The village is populated by Lurs.
