= Qaleh Sabzi =

Village in Chaharmahal and Bakhtiari, Iran

Qaleh Sabzi قلعه سبزي
- Village
- Location within Iran
- Coordinates: 32°30′39″N 50°14′38″E
- Country: Iran
- Province: Chaharmahal and Bakhtiari
- County: Kuhrang
- Bakhsh: Central
- Rural District: Shurab-e Tangazi

Population (2006)
  - Total: 14
- Time zone: UTC+3:30 (IRST)
  - Summer (DST): UTC+4:30 (IRDT)

Qaleh Sabzi (Persian: قلعه سبزي, also Romanized as Qal‘eh Sabzī) is a village in Shurab-e Tangazi Rural District, in the Central District of Kuhrang County, Chaharmahal and Bakhtiari Province, Iran. At the 2006 census, its population was 14, in 4 families. The village is populated by Lurs.
