= Shahrak-e Nur =

Shahrak-e Nur شهرك نور
- Village
- Location within Iran
- Coordinates: 31°23′18″N 50°50′12″E
- Country: Iran
- Province: Chaharmahal and Bakhtiari
- County: Lordegan
- Bakhsh: Central
- Rural District: Sardasht

Population (2006)
  - Total: 117
- Time zone: UTC+3:30 (IRST)
  - Summer (DST): UTC+4:30 (IRDT)

Shahrak-e Nur (Persian: شهرك نور, also Romanized as Shahrak-e Nūr) is a village in Sardasht Rural District, in the Central District of Lordegan County, Chaharmahal and Bakhtiari Province, Iran. At the 2006 census, its population was 117, in 22 families.
