= Ab Kharreh =

Ab Kharreh ابخره
- Village
- Location within Iran
- Coordinates: 32°29′47″N 50°16′55″E
- Country: Iran
- Province: Chaharmahal and Bakhtiari
- County: Kuhrang
- Bakhsh: Central
- Rural District: Shurab-e Tangazi

Population (2006)
  - Total: 20
- Time zone: UTC+3:30 (IRST)
  - Summer (DST): UTC+4:30 (IRDT)

Ab Kharreh (Persian: ابخره, also Romanized as Āb Kharreh, Āb Khareh, and Āb Khoreh; also known as Āb Khvoreh) is a village in Shurab-e Tangazi Rural District, in the Central District of Kuhrang County, Chaharmahal and Bakhtiari Province, Iran. At the 2006 census, its population was 20, in 6 families. The village is populated by Lurs.
