= Yavarabad =

Yavarabad ياوراباد
- Village
- Location within Iran
- Coordinates: 32°16′48″N 50°18′15″E
- Country: Iran
- Province: Chaharmahal and Bakhtiari
- County: Kuhrang
- Bakhsh: Central
- Rural District: Shurab-e Tangazi

Population (2006)
  - Total: 74
- Time zone: UTC+3:30 (IRST)
  - Summer (DST): UTC+4:30 (IRDT)

Yavarabad (Persian: ياوراباد, also Romanized as Yāvarābād) is a village in Shurab-e Tangazi Rural District, in the Central District of Kuhrang County, Chaharmahal and Bakhtiari Province, Iran. At the 2006 census, its population was 74, in 17 families. The village is populated by Lurs.
