= Hushut =

Hushut هوشوت
- Village
- Location within Iran
- Coordinates: 32°20′14″N 49°55′31″E
- Country: Iran
- Province: Chaharmahal and Bakhtiari
- County: Kuhrang
- Bakhsh: Bazoft
- Rural District: Bazoft

Population (2006)
  - Total: 219
- Time zone: UTC+3:30 (IRST)
  - Summer (DST): UTC+4:30 (IRDT)

Hushut (Persian: هوشوت, also Romanized as Hūshūt) is a village in Bazoft Rural District, Bazoft District, Kuhrang County, Chaharmahal and Bakhtiari Province, Iran. At the 2006 census, its population was 219, in 39 families. The village is populated by Lurs.
