= Sheykh Ali Khan =

Sheykh Ali Khan شيخ علي خان
- Village
- Location within Iran
- Coordinates: 32°30′14″N 50°03′46″E
- Country: Iran
- Province: Chaharmahal and Bakhtiari
- County: Kuhrang
- Bakhsh: Central
- Rural District: Shurab-e Tangazi

Population (2006)
  - Total: 204
- Time zone: UTC+3:30 (IRST)
  - Summer (DST): UTC+4:30 (IRDT)

Sheykh Ali Khan (Persian: شيخ علي خان, also Romanized as Sheykh ‘Alī Khān) is a village in Shurab-e Tangazi Rural District, in the Central District of Kuhrang County, Chaharmahal and Bakhtiari Province, Iran. At the 2006 census, its population was 204, in 49 families. The village is populated by Lurs.
