= Abu ol Qasemabad =

Coordinates: 32°13′15″N 50°00′16″E

Abu ol Qasemabad ابوالقاسم اباد
- Village
- Interactive map of Abu ol Qasemabad
- Country: Iran
- Province: Chaharmahal and Bakhtiari
- County: Kuhrang
- Bakhsh: Central
- Rural District: Dasht-e Zarrin

Population (2006)
  - Total: 37
- Time zone: UTC+3:30 (IRST)
  - Summer (DST): UTC+4:30 (IRDT)

Abu ol Qasemabad (Persian: ابوالقاسم اباد, also Romanized as Abū ol Qāsemābād) is a village in Dasht-e Zarrin Rural District, in the Central District of Kuhrang County, Chaharmahal and Bakhtiari Province, Iran. At the 2006 census, its population was 37, in 10 families. The village is populated by Lurs.
