= Sarreh Zard =

Sarreh Zard سره زرد
- Village
- Location within Iran
- Coordinates: 31°43′30″N 50°34′09″E
- Country: Iran
- Province: Chaharmahal and Bakhtiari
- County: Ardal
- Bakhsh: Miankuh
- Rural District: Miankuh

Population (2006)
  - Total: 330
- Time zone: UTC+3:30 (IRST)
  - Summer (DST): UTC+4:30 (IRDT)

Sarreh Zard (Persian: سره زرد, also Romanized as Sar Zard) is a village in Miankuh Rural District, Miankuh District, Ardal County, Chaharmahal and Bakhtiari Province, Iran. At the 2006 census, its population was 330, in 63 families. The village is populated by Lurs.
