= Rostam Beyg =

Rostam Beyg رستم بيگ
- Village
- Location within Iran
- Coordinates: 31°14′10″N 51°12′54″E
- Country: Iran
- Province: Chaharmahal and Bakhtiari
- County: Lordegan
- Bakhsh: Falard
- Rural District: Poshtkuh

Population (2006)
  - Total: 131
- Time zone: UTC+3:30 (IRST)
  - Summer (DST): UTC+4:30 (IRDT)

Rostam Beyg (Persian: رستم بيگ; also known as Pāzanī, Rostam Bak, Rostam Begī, and Rostam Beyk) is a village in Poshtkuh Rural District, Falard District, Lordegan County, Chaharmahal and Bakhtiari Province, Iran. At the 2006 census, its population was 131, in 30 families. The village is populated by Lurs.
