= Qaleh-ye Fereydun, Chaharmahal and Bakhtiari =

Village in Chaharmahal and Bakhtiari, Iran

Qaleh-ye Fereydun قلعه فريدون
- Village
- Location within Iran
- Coordinates: 32°23′52″N 50°17′36″E
- Country: Iran
- Province: Chaharmahal and Bakhtiari
- County: Kuhrang
- Bakhsh: Central
- Rural District: Dasht-e Zarrin

Population (2006)
  - Total: 315
- Time zone: UTC+3:30 (IRST)
  - Summer (DST): UTC+4:30 (IRDT)

Qaleh-ye Fereydun (Persian: قلعه فريدون, also Romanized as Qal‘eh-ye Fereydūn and Qal’eh Fereydūn; also known as Fereydūnābād, Qal‘eh Fereydon, and Qal‘eh-ye Fereydūnābād) is a village in Dasht-e Zarrin Rural District, in the Central District of Kuhrang County, Chaharmahal and Bakhtiari Province, Iran. At the 2006 census, its population was 315, in 44 families. The village is populated by Lurs.
