= Chel Mangasiun-e Sofla =

Chel Mangasiun-e Sofla چلمانگاسيون سفلي
- Village
- Location within Iran
- Coordinates: 31°21′37″N 50°45′19″E
- Country: Iran
- Province: Chaharmahal and Bakhtiari
- County: Lordegan
- Bakhsh: Central
- Rural District: Sardasht

Population (2006)
  - Total: 55
- Time zone: UTC+3:30 (IRST)
  - Summer (DST): UTC+4:30 (IRDT)

Chel Mangasiun-e Sofla (Persian: چلمانگاسيون سفلي, also Romanized as Chel Mangāsīūn-e Soflá; also known as Cheleh-ye Mangāsīūn) is a village in Sardasht Rural District, in the Central District of Lordegan County, Chaharmahal and Bakhtiari Province, Iran. At the 2006 census, its population was 55, in 9 families.
