= Dowleh Khargush =

Dowleh Khargush دوله خرگوش
- Village
- Country: Iran
- Province: Chaharmahal and Bakhtiari
- County: Lordegan
- Bakhsh: Manj
- Rural District: Manj

Population (2006)
  - Total: 382
- Time zone: UTC+3:30 (IRST)
  - Summer (DST): UTC+4:30 (IRDT)

Dowleh Khargush (Persian: دوله خرگوش, also Romanized as Dowleh Khargūsh) is a village in Manj Rural District, Manj District, Lordegan County, Chaharmahal and Bakhtiari Province, Iran. At the 2006 census, its population was 382, in 86 families. The village is populated by Lurs.
