= Ilbegi =

Ilbegi ايلبگي
- Village
- Location within Iran
- Coordinates: 32°29′58″N 50°53′54″E
- Country: Iran
- Province: Chaharmahal and Bakhtiari
- County: Saman
- Rural District: Saman

Population (2006)
  - Total: 443
- Time zone: UTC+3:30 (IRST)
  - Summer (DST): UTC+4:30 (IRDT)

Ilbegi (Persian: ايلبگي, also Romanized as Īlbegī and Īlbagī; also known as Īlbeygī) is a village in Saman Rural District, Saman County, Chaharmahal and Bakhtiari Province, Iran. At the 2006 census, its population was 443, in 120 families. 90 percent of the village speaks Charmahali, while 10 percent speaks Turkic.
