= Haft Piran =

Haft Piran هفت پيران
- Village
- Location within Iran
- Coordinates: 31°56′54″N 50°34′44″E
- Country: Iran
- Province: Chaharmahal and Bakhtiari
- County: Ardal
- Bakhsh: Central
- Rural District: Poshtkuh

Population (2006)
  - Total: 123
- Time zone: UTC+3:30 (IRST)
  - Summer (DST): UTC+4:30 (IRDT)

Haft Piran (Persian: هفت پيران, also Romanized as Haft Pīrān; also known as Haft Pīr) is a village in Poshtkuh Rural District, in the Central District of Ardal County, Chaharmahal and Bakhtiari Province, Iran. At the 2006 census, its population was 123, in 26 families. The village is populated by Lurs.
