= Murdel =

Murdel موردل
- Village
- Location within Iran
- Coordinates: 32°17′41″N 50°16′28″E
- Country: Iran
- Province: Chaharmahal and Bakhtiari
- County: Kuhrang
- Bakhsh: Central
- Rural District: Shurab-e Tangazi

Population (2006)
  - Total: 71
- Time zone: UTC+3:30 (IRST)
  - Summer (DST): UTC+4:30 (IRDT)

Murdel (Persian: موردل, also Romanized as Mūrdel) is a village in Shurab-e Tangazi Rural District, in the Central District of Kuhrang County, Chaharmahal and Bakhtiari Province, Iran. At the 2006 census, its population was 71, in 19 families. The village is populated by Lurs.
