= Shahrak-e Mohammadi =

Shahrak-e Mohammadi شهرك محمدئ
- Village
- Country: Iran
- Province: Chaharmahal and Bakhtiari
- County: Ardal
- Bakhsh: Miankuh
- Rural District: Shalil

Population (2006)
  - Total: 577
- Time zone: UTC+3:30 (IRST)
  - Summer (DST): UTC+4:30 (IRDT)

Shahrak-e Mohammadi (Persian: شهرك محمدئ, also Romanized as Shahrak-e Moḩammadī) is a village in Shalil Rural District, Miankuh District, Ardal County, Chaharmahal and Bakhtiari Province, Iran. At the 2006 census, its population was 577, in 107 families. The village is populated by Lurs.
