= Dasht-e Pagerd =

Dasht-e Pagerd دشت پاگرد
- Village
- Location within Iran
- Coordinates: 31°15′38″N 51°15′30″E
- Country: Iran
- Province: Chaharmahal and Bakhtiari
- County: Lordegan
- Bakhsh: Falard
- Rural District: Falard

Population (2006)
  - Total: 732
- Time zone: UTC+3:30 (IRST)
  - Summer (DST): UTC+4:30 (IRDT)

Dasht-e Pagerd (Persian: دشت پاگرد, also Romanized as Dasht-e Pāgerd, Dashte Pāgerd, Dasht Pāgard, and Dasht Pāgerd) is a village in Falard Rural District, Falard District, Lordegan County, Chaharmahal and Bakhtiari Province, Iran. At the 2006 census, its population was 732, in 142 families. The village is populated by Lurs.
