= Qaleh-ye Hajj Jahanqoli =

Village in Chaharmahal and Bakhtiari, Iran

Qaleh-ye Hajj Jahanqoli قلعه حاج جهانقلي
- Village
- Location within Iran
- Coordinates: 32°21′37″N 50°25′57″E
- Country: Iran
- Province: Chaharmahal and Bakhtiari
- County: Farsan
- Bakhsh: Central
- Rural District: Mizdej-e Olya

Population (2006)
  - Total: 68
- Time zone: UTC+3:30 (IRST)
  - Summer (DST): UTC+4:30 (IRDT)

Qaleh-ye Hajj Jahanqoli (Persian: قلعه حاج جهانقلي, also Romanized as Qal‘eh-ye Ḩājj Jahānqolī; also known as Qal‘eh-ye Ḩājjahānqolī) is a village in Mizdej-e Olya Rural District, in the Central District of Farsan County, Chaharmahal and Bakhtiari Province, Iran. At the 2006 census, its population was 68, in 11 families. The village is populated by Lurs.
