= Katula =

Katula كتولا
- Village
- Location within Iran
- Coordinates: 31°38′26″N 50°28′02″E
- Country: Iran
- Province: Chaharmahal and Bakhtiari
- County: Ardal
- Bakhsh: Miankuh
- Rural District: Shalil

Population (2006)
  - Total: 78
- Time zone: UTC+3:30 (IRST)
  - Summer (DST): UTC+4:30 (IRDT)

Katula (Persian: كتولا, also Romanized as Katūlā) is a village in Shalil Rural District, Miankuh District, Ardal County, Chaharmahal and Bakhtiari Province, Iran. At the 2006 census, its population was 78, in 13 families.
