= Ali Hemmatabad-e Tahmasabi =

Ali Hemmatabad-e Tahmasabi علي همت ابادطهماسبي
- Village
- Location within Iran
- Coordinates: 31°32′19″N 50°37′37″E
- Country: Iran
- Province: Chaharmahal and Bakhtiari
- County: Lordegan
- Bakhsh: Manj
- Rural District: Manj

Population (2006)
  - Total: 79
- Time zone: UTC+3:30 (IRST)
  - Summer (DST): UTC+4:30 (IRDT)

Ali Hemmatabad-e Tahmasabi (Persian: علي همت ابادطهماسبي, also Romanized as ʿAlī Hemmatābād-e Ţahmāsabī; also known as ʿAlīhemmatābād) is a village in Manj Rural District, Manj District, Lordegan County, Chaharmahal and Bakhtiari Province, Iran. At the 2006 census, its population was 79, in 12 families.
