= Darreh Bala =

Darreh Bala دره بالا
- Village
- Location within Iran
- Coordinates: 32°38′37″N 49°36′18″E
- Country: Iran
- Province: Chaharmahal and Bakhtiari
- County: Kuhrang
- Bakhsh: Bazoft
- Rural District: Bazoft

Population (2006)
  - Total: 27
- Time zone: UTC+3:30 (IRST)
  - Summer (DST): UTC+4:30 (IRDT)

Darreh Bala (Persian: دره بالا, also Romanized as Darreh Bālā; also known as Darrehbālā) is a village in Bazoft Rural District, Bazoft District, Kuhrang County, Chaharmahal and Bakhtiari Province, Iran. At the 2006 census, its population was 27, in 4 families. The village is populated by Lurs.
