= Darreh Eshq =

Darreh Eshq دره عشق
- village
- Location within Iran
- Coordinates: 31°46′00″N 50°48′05″E
- Country: Iran
- Province: Chaharmahal and Bakhtiari
- County: Kiar
- Bakhsh: Naghan
- Rural District: Mashayekh

Population (2006)
  - Total: 154
- Time zone: UTC+3:30 (IRST)
  - Summer (DST): UTC+4:30 (IRDT)

Darreh Eshq (Persian: دره عشق, also Romanized as Darreh ‘Eshq and Darreh-ye ‘Eshq) is a village in Mashayekh Rural District, Naghan District, Kiar County, Chaharmahal and Bakhtiari Province, Iran. At the 2006 census, its population was 154, in 36 families. The village is populated by Lurs.
