= Sar Tang-e Mahmud =

Sar Tang-e Mahmud سرتنگ محمود
- Village
- Location within Iran
- Coordinates: 31°53′43″N 50°30′14″E
- Country: Iran
- Province: Chaharmahal and Bakhtiari
- County: Kiar
- Bakhsh: Naghan
- Rural District: Mashayekh

Population (2006)
  - Total: 475
- Time zone: UTC+3:30 (IRST)
  - Summer (DST): UTC+4:30 (IRDT)

Sar Tang-e Mahmud (Persian: سرتنگ محمود, also Romanized as Sar Tang-e Maḩmūd; also known as Sar Tang-e Maḩmūdī) is a village in Mashayekh Rural District, Naghan District, Kiar County, Chaharmahal and Bakhtiari Province, Iran. At the 2006 census, its population was 475, in 108 families. The village is populated by Lurs.
