= Kuh Narmeh =

Kuh Narmeh كوه نارمه
- Village
- Location within Iran
- Coordinates: 31°10′50″N 51°08′06″E
- Country: Iran
- Province: Chaharmahal and Bakhtiari
- County: Lordegan
- Bakhsh: Falard
- Rural District: Poshtkuh

Population (2006)
  - Total: 165
- Time zone: UTC+3:30 (IRST)
  - Summer (DST): UTC+4:30 (IRDT)

Kuh Narmeh (Persian: كوه نارمه, also Romanized as Kūh Nārmeh) is a village in Poshtkuh Rural District, Falard District, Lordegan County, Chaharmahal and Bakhtiari Province, Iran. At the 2006 census, its population was 165, in 36 families. The village is populated by Lurs.
