= Darreh Gavmish, Chaharmahal and Bakhtiari =

Darreh Gavmish دره گاوميش
- Village
- Country: Iran
- Province: Chaharmahal and Bakhtiari
- County: Kuhrang
- Bakhsh: Bazoft
- Rural District: Bazoft

Population (2006)
  - Total: 21
- Time zone: UTC+3:30 (IRST)
  - Summer (DST): UTC+4:30 (IRDT)

Darreh Gavmish (Persian: دره گاوميش, also Romanized as Darreh Gāvmīsh) is a village in Bazoft Rural District, Bazoft District, Kuhrang County, Chaharmahal and Bakhtiari Province, Iran. At the 2006 census, its population was 21, in 4 families.
