= Aduk =

Aduk عدوك
- Village
- Location within Iran
- Coordinates: 31°20′40″N 50°50′20″E
- Country: Iran
- Province: Chaharmahal and Bakhtiari
- County: Lordegan
- Bakhsh: Central
- Rural District: Sardasht

Population (2006)
  - Total: 128
- Time zone: UTC+3:30 (IRST)
  - Summer (DST): UTC+4:30 (IRDT)

Aduk (Persian: عدوك, also Romanized as Adūk; also known as ‘Adūk-e Dūderā’) is a village in Sardasht Rural District, in the Central District of Lordegan County, Chaharmahal and Bakhtiari Province, Iran. At the 2006 census, its population was 128, in 22 families. The village is populated by Lurs.
