= Ram Run =

Village in Chaharmahal and Bakhtiari, Iran

Ram Run رمرون
- Village
- Location within Iran
- Coordinates: 31°26′51″N 50°32′17″E
- Country: Iran
- Province: Chaharmahal and Bakhtiari
- County: Lordegan
- Bakhsh: Manj
- Rural District: Barez

Population (2006)
  - Total: 201
- Time zone: UTC+3:30 (IRST)
  - Summer (DST): UTC+4:30 (IRDT)

Ram Run (Persian: رمرون, also Romanized as Ram Rūn; also known as Rameh Ran and Rameh Rūn) is a village in Barez Rural District, Manj District, Lordegan County, Chaharmahal and Bakhtiari Province, Iran. At the 2006 census, its population was 201, in 37 families.
