= Lahmari-ye Do =

Lahmari-ye Do له مارئدو
- Village
- Location within Iran
- Coordinates: 31°21′41″N 50°48′23″E
- Country: Iran
- Province: Chaharmahal and Bakhtiari
- County: Lordegan
- Bakhsh: Central
- Rural District: Sardasht

Population (2006)
  - Total: 45
- Time zone: UTC+3:30 (IRST)
  - Summer (DST): UTC+4:30 (IRDT)

Lahmari-ye Do (Persian: له مارئدو, also Romanized as Lahmārī-ye Do; also known as Lahmārī) is a village in Sardasht Rural District, in the Central District of Lordegan County, Chaharmahal and Bakhtiari Province, Iran. At the 2006 census, its population was 45, in 8 families. The village is populated by Lurs.
