= Gowd-e Banushir =

Gowd-e Banushir گودبنوشير
- Village
- Location within Iran
- Coordinates: 31°29′54″N 50°28′47″E
- Country: Iran
- Province: Chaharmahal and Bakhtiari
- County: Lordegan
- Bakhsh: Manj
- Rural District: Barez

Population (2006)
  - Total: 25
- Time zone: UTC+3:30 (IRST)
  - Summer (DST): UTC+4:30 (IRDT)

Gowd-e Banushir (Persian: گودبنوشير, also Romanized as Gowd-e Banūshīr; also known as Gowd-e Banashīr) is a village in Barez Rural District, Manj District, Lordegan County, Chaharmahal and Bakhtiari Province, Iran. At the 2006 census, its population was 25, in 4 families.
