= Bard-e Karkhaneh =

Bard-e Karkhaneh بردكارخانه
- Village
- Location within Iran
- Coordinates: 31°28′38″N 50°42′25″E
- Country: Iran
- Province: Chaharmahal and Bakhtiari
- County: Lordegan
- Bakhsh: Central
- Rural District: Milas

Population (2006)
  - Total: 71
- Time zone: UTC+3:30 (IRST)
  - Summer (DST): UTC+4:30 (IRDT)

Bard-e Karkhaneh (Persian: بردكارخانه, also Romanized as Bard-e Kārkhāneh; also known as Bar-e Kārkhāneh) is a village in Milas Rural District, in the Central District of Lordegan County, Chaharmahal and Bakhtiari Province, Iran. At the 2006 census, its population was 71, in 16 families.
