= Shahrak-e Rahberi =

Shahrak-e Rahberi شهرک رهبري
- Village
- Country: Iran
- Province: Chaharmahal and Bakhtiari
- County: Kuhrang
- Bakhsh: Bazoft
- Rural District: Bazoft

Population (2006)
  - Total: 101
- Time zone: UTC+3:30 (IRST)
  - Summer (DST): UTC+4:30 (IRDT)

Shahrak-e Rahberi (Persian: شهرک رهبري, also Romanized as Shahrak-e Rahberī) is a village in Bazoft Rural District, Bazoft District, Kuhrang County, Chaharmahal and Bakhtiari Province, Iran. At the 2006 census, its population was 101, in 21 families. The village is populated by Lurs.
