= Lachenar =

Lachenar لاچنار
- Village
- Location within Iran
- Coordinates: 31°33′15″N 50°36′56″E
- Country: Iran
- Province: Chaharmahal and Bakhtiari
- County: Lordegan
- Bakhsh: Manj
- Rural District: Manj

Population (2006)
  - Total: 48
- Time zone: UTC+3:30 (IRST)
  - Summer (DST): UTC+4:30 (IRDT)

Lachenar (Persian: لاچنار, also written as Lāchenār) is a village located within the Manj Rural District, part of the Manj District, situated in the Lordegan County of Chaharmahal and Bakhtiari Province, Iran. As of the 2006 census, Lachenar was home to a population of 48 individuals, residing in 8 families. The village is predominantly inhabited by the Lur ethnicity group.
