= Sur Mandeh =

Sur Mandeh سورمنده
- Village
- Location within Iran
- Coordinates: 31°32′43″N 50°37′20″E
- Country: Iran
- Province: Chaharmahal and Bakhtiari
- County: Lordegan
- Bakhsh: Manj
- Rural District: Manj

Population (2006)
  - Total: 43
- Time zone: UTC+3:30 (IRST)
  - Summer (DST): UTC+4:30 (IRDT)

Sur Mandeh (Persian: سورمنده, also Romanized as Sūr Mandeh; also known as Sīr Mandeh) is a village in Manj Rural District, Manj District, Lordegan County, Chaharmahal and Bakhtiari Province, Iran. At the 2006 census, its population was 44, in 8 families, and the village is populated by Lurs.
