= Karavanserai-ye Shalil =

Karavanserai-ye Shalil كاروانسراي شليل
- Village
- Location within Iran
- Coordinates: 31°44′13″N 50°25′09″E
- Country: Iran
- Province: Chaharmahal and Bakhtiari
- County: Ardal
- Bakhsh: Miankuh
- Rural District: Shalil

Population (2006)
  - Total: 21
- Time zone: UTC+3:30 (IRST)
  - Summer (DST): UTC+4:30 (IRDT)

Karavanserai-ye Shalil (Persian: كاروانسراي شليل, also Romanized as Kāravānserāī-ye Shalīl; also known as Kārevānsarā) is a village in Shalil Rural District, Miankuh District, Ardal County, Chaharmahal and Bakhtiari Province, Iran. At the 2006 census, its population was 21, in 4 families. The village is populated by Lurs.
