= Bandun-e Olya =

Bandun-e Olya بندون عليا
- Village
- Location within Iran
- Coordinates: 31°26′45″N 50°36′47″E
- Country: Iran
- Province: Chaharmahal and Bakhtiari
- County: Lordegan
- Bakhsh: Manj
- Rural District: Barez

Population (2006)
  - Total: 73
- Time zone: UTC+3:30 (IRST)
  - Summer (DST): UTC+4:30 (IRDT)

Bandun-e Olya (Persian: بندون عليا, also Romanized as Bandūn-e ‘Olyā; also known as Bandūn, Deh Bāndūn, Deh-e Bandān, and Deh-e Bandūn) is a village in Barez Rural District, Manj District, Lordegan County, Chaharmahal and Bakhtiari Province, Iran. At the 2006 census, its population was 73, in 15 families.
