= Gahkadeh =

Gahkadeh گاه كده
- Village
- Location within Iran
- Coordinates: 31°11′06″N 51°03′15″E
- Country: Iran
- Province: Chaharmahal and Bakhtiari
- County: Lordegan
- Bakhsh: Central
- Rural District: Sardasht

Population (2006)
  - Total: 42
- Time zone: UTC+3:30 (IRST)
  - Summer (DST): UTC+4:30 (IRDT)

Gahkadeh (Persian: گاه كده, also Romanized as Gāhkadeh) is a village in Sardasht Rural District, in the Central District of Lordegan County, Chaharmahal and Bakhtiari Province, Iran. At the 2006 census, its population was 42, in 10 families. The village is populated by Lurs.
