= Jaju-ye Faj =

Jaju-ye Faj جاجوفاج
- Village
- Location within Iran
- Coordinates: 31°11′40″N 51°03′00″E
- Country: Iran
- Province: Chaharmahal and Bakhtiari
- County: Lordegan
- Bakhsh: Central
- Rural District: Sardasht

Population (2006)
  - Total: 54
- Time zone: UTC+3:30 (IRST)
  - Summer (DST): UTC+4:30 (IRDT)

Jaju-ye Faj (Persian: جاجوفاج, also Romanized as Jājū-ye Fāj; also known as Jājū) is a village in Sardasht Rural District, in the Central District of Lordegan County, Chaharmahal and Bakhtiari Province, Iran. At the 2006 census, its population was 54, in 10 families. The village is populated by Lurs.
