= Nalbandun =

Nalbandun نالبندون
- Village
- Location within Iran
- Coordinates: 32°08′50″N 50°06′41″E
- Country: Iran
- Province: Chaharmahal and Bakhtiari
- County: Kuhrang
- Bakhsh: Bazoft
- Rural District: Doab

Population (2006)
  - Total: 523
- Time zone: UTC+3:30 (IRST)
  - Summer (DST): UTC+4:30 (IRDT)

Nalbandun (Persian: نالبندون, also Romanized as Nālbandūn; also known as Nālbandān) is a village in Doab Rural District, Bazoft District, Kuhrang County, Chaharmahal and Bakhtiari Province, Iran. At the 2006 census, its population was 523, in 95 families. The village is populated by Lurs.
