= Shahrak-e Kuranabad =

Shahrak-e Kuranabad شهرك كوران اباد
- Village
- Location within Iran
- Coordinates: 32°09′11″N 50°28′26″E
- Country: Iran
- Province: Chaharmahal and Bakhtiari
- County: Ardal
- Bakhsh: Central
- Rural District: Poshtkuh

Population (2006)
  - Total: 363
- Time zone: UTC+3:30 (IRST)
  - Summer (DST): UTC+4:30 (IRDT)

Shahrak-e Kuranabad (Persian: شهرك كوران اباد, also Romanized as Shahrak-e Kūrānābād) is a village in Poshtkuh Rural District, in the Central District of Ardal County, Chaharmahal and Bakhtiari Province, Iran. At the 2006 census, its population was 363, in 64 families. The village is populated by Lurs.
