= Cheshmeh Soleyman =

Cheshmeh Soleyman چشمه سليمان
- Village
- Location within Iran
- Coordinates: 32°02′45″N 50°22′40″E
- Country: Iran
- Province: Chaharmahal and Bakhtiari
- County: Ardal
- Bakhsh: Central
- Rural District: Dinaran

Population (2006)
  - Total: 93
- Time zone: UTC+3:30 (IRST)
  - Summer (DST): UTC+4:30 (IRDT)

Cheshmeh Soleyman (Persian: چشمه سليمان, also Romanized as Cheshmeh Soleymān) is a village in Dinaran Rural District, in the Central District of Ardal County, Chaharmahal and Bakhtiari Province, Iran. At the 2006 census, its population was 93, in 21 families. The village is populated by Lurs.
