= Shush, Chaharmahal and Bakhtiari =

Shush شوش
- Village
- Location within Iran
- Coordinates: 31°15′18″N 50°58′49″E
- Country: Iran
- Province: Chaharmahal and Bakhtiari
- County: Lordegan
- Bakhsh: Central
- Rural District: Sardasht

Population (2006)
  - Total: 122
- Time zone: UTC+3:30 (IRST)
  - Summer (DST): UTC+4:30 (IRDT)

Shush (Persian: شوش, also Romanized as Shūsh) is a village in Sardasht Rural District, in the Central District of Lordegan County, Chaharmahal and Bakhtiari Province, Iran. At the 2006 census, its population was 122, in 24 families.
