= Sharmak =

Sharmak شرمك
- Village
- Location within Iran
- Coordinates: 32°25′52″N 49°53′21″E
- Country: Iran
- Province: Chaharmahal and Bakhtiari
- County: Kuhrang
- Bakhsh: Bazoft
- Rural District: Bazoft

Population (2006)
  - Total: 66
- Time zone: UTC+3:30 (IRST)
  - Summer (DST): UTC+4:30 (IRDT)

Sharmak (Persian: شرمك) is a village in Bazoft Rural District, Bazoft District, Kuhrang County, Chaharmahal and Bakhtiari Province, Iran. At the 2006 census, its population was 66 divided among 10 families. The village is populated by Lurs.
