= Badreh-ye Semi Yagardava =

Badreh-ye Semi Yagardava بادره سمي ياگردوا
- Village
- Country: Iran
- Province: Chaharmahal and Bakhtiari
- County: Ardal
- Bakhsh: Central
- Rural District: Dinaran

Population (2006)
  - Total: 66
- Time zone: UTC+3:30 (IRST)
  - Summer (DST): UTC+4:30 (IRDT)

Badreh-ye Semi Yagardava (Persian: بادره سمي ياگردوا, also Romanized as Bādreh-ye Semī Yāgardavā) is a village in Dinaran Rural District, in the Central District of Ardal County, Chaharmahal and Bakhtiari Province, Iran. At the 2006 census, its population was 66, in 12 families. The village is populated by Lurs.
