= Shakarteh =

Village in Chaharmahal and Bakhtiari, Iran

Shakarteh شكرته
- Village
- Location within Iran
- Coordinates: 31°29′23″N 50°31′43″E
- Country: Iran
- Province: Chaharmahal and Bakhtiari
- County: Lordegan
- Bakhsh: Manj
- Rural District: Barez

Population (2006)
  - Total: 95
- Time zone: UTC+3:30 (IRST)
  - Summer (DST): UTC+4:30 (IRDT)

Shakarteh (Persian: شكرته; also known as Gowd-e Shekarteh) is a village in Barez Rural District, Manj District, Lordegan County, Chaharmahal and Bakhtiari Province, Iran. At the 2006 census, its population was 95, in 18 families.
