= Seyl Gah =

Seyl Gah سيل گاه
- Village
- Location within Iran
- Coordinates: 32°28′52″N 50°17′06″E
- Country: Iran
- Province: Chaharmahal and Bakhtiari
- County: Kuhrang
- Bakhsh: Central
- Rural District: Dasht-e Zarrin

Population (2006)
  - Total: 175
- Time zone: UTC+3:30 (IRST)
  - Summer (DST): UTC+4:30 (IRDT)

Seyl Gah (Persian: سيل گاه, also Romanized as Seyl Gāh, Seil Gah, and Seyl-e Gāh; also known as Shīlgāh) is a village in Dasht-e Zarrin Rural District, in the Central District of Kuhrang County, Chaharmahal and Bakhtiari Province, Iran. At the 2006 census, its population was 175, in 25 families. The village is populated by Lurs.
