= Deh Deli =

Deh Deli ده دلي
- Village
- Location within Iran
- Coordinates: 31°55′34″N 50°16′14″E
- Country: Iran
- Province: Chaharmahal and Bakhtiari
- County: Ardal
- Bakhsh: Central
- Rural District: Dinaran

Population (2006)
  - Total: 106
- Time zone: UTC+3:30 (IRST)
  - Summer (DST): UTC+4:30 (IRDT)

Deh Deli (Persian: ده دلي, also Romanized as Deh Delī and Deh-e Delī; also known as Deh Delī Yek and Deh Valī) is a village in Dinaran Rural District, in the Central District of Ardal County, Chaharmahal and Bakhtiari Province, Iran. At the 2006 census, its population was 106, in 17 families. The village is populated by Lurs.
