= Khiyarkar =

Khiyarkar خياركار
- Village
- Location within Iran
- Coordinates: 32°12′51″N 50°00′09″E
- Country: Iran
- Province: Chaharmahal and Bakhtiari
- County: Kuhrang
- Bakhsh: Bazoft
- Rural District: Bazoft

Population (2006)
  - Total: 54
- Time zone: UTC+3:30 (IRST)
  - Summer (DST): UTC+4:30 (IRDT)

Khiyarkar (Persian: خياركار, also Romanized as Khīyārkār) is a village in Bazoft Rural District, Bazoft District, Kuhrang County, Chaharmahal and Bakhtiari Province, Iran. At the 2006 census, its population was 54, in 10 families. The village is populated by Lurs.
