= Neysiyaq =

Neysiyaq نيسياق
- Village
- Location within Iran
- Coordinates: 32°09′09″N 50°28′20″E
- Country: Iran
- Province: Chaharmahal and Bakhtiari
- County: Ardal
- Bakhsh: Central
- Rural District: Poshtkuh

Population (2006)
  - Total: 213
- Time zone: UTC+3:30 (IRST)
  - Summer (DST): UTC+4:30 (IRDT)

Neysiyaq (Persian: نيسياق, also Romanized as Neysīyāq) is a village in Poshtkuh Rural District, in the Central District of Ardal County, Chaharmahal and Bakhtiari Province, Iran. At the 2006 census, its population was 213, in 44 families. The village is populated by Lurs.
