= Kall Ab Chenar =

Kall Ab Chenar كل ابچنار
- Village
- Location within Iran
- Coordinates: 31°26′15″N 50°42′26″E
- Country: Iran
- Province: Chaharmahal and Bakhtiari
- County: Lordegan
- Bakhsh: Central
- Rural District: Milas

Population (2006)
  - Total: 55
- Time zone: UTC+3:30 (IRST)
  - Summer (DST): UTC+4:30 (IRDT)

Kall Ab Chenar (Persian: كل ابچنار, also Romanized as Kall Āb Chenār) is a village in Milas Rural District, in the Central District of Lordegan County, Chaharmahal and Bakhtiari Province, Iran. At the 2006 census, its population was 55, in 11 families.
