= Qaleh Rashid =

Village in Chaharmahal and Bakhtiari, Iran

Qaleh Rashid قلعه رشيد
- Village
- Location within Iran
- Coordinates: 32°06′52″N 50°31′14″E
- Country: Iran
- Province: Chaharmahal and Bakhtiari
- County: Ardal
- Bakhsh: Central
- Rural District: Poshtkuh

Population (2006)
  - Total: 638
- Time zone: UTC+3:30 (IRST)
  - Summer (DST): UTC+4:30 (IRDT)

Qaleh Rashid (Persian: قلعه رشيد, also Romanized as Qal‘eh Rashīd and Qal‘eh-ye Rashīd; also known as Ghal‘eh Rashid) is a village in Poshtkuh Rural District, in the Central District of Ardal County, Chaharmahal and Bakhtiari Province, Iran. At the 2006 census, its population was 638, in 145 families. The village is populated by Lurs.
