= Arjal =

Arjal ارجل
- Village
- Location within Iran
- Coordinates: 31°55′29″N 50°29′39″E
- Country: Iran
- Province: Chaharmahal and Bakhtiari
- County: Ardal
- Bakhsh: Central
- Rural District: Dinaran

Population (2006)
  - Total: 333
- Time zone: UTC+3:30 (IRST)
  - Summer (DST): UTC+4:30 (IRDT)

Arjal (Persian: ارجل) is a village in Dinaran Rural District, in the Central District of Ardal County, Chaharmahal and Bakhtiari Province, Iran. At the 2006 census, its population was 333, in 50 families. The village is populated by Lurs.
