= Shahrak-e Gholamabad =

Shahrak-e Gholamabad شهرک غلام اباد
- Village
- Country: Iran
- Province: Chaharmahal and Bakhtiari
- County: Kuhrang
- Bakhsh: Central
- Rural District: Dasht-e Zarrin

Population (2006)
  - Total: 69
- Time zone: UTC+3:30 (IRST)
  - Summer (DST): UTC+4:30 (IRDT)

Shahrak-e Gholamabad (Persian: شهرک غلام اباد, also Romanized as Shahrak-e Gholāmābād) is a village in Dasht-e Zarrin Rural District, in the Central District of Kuhrang County, Chaharmahal and Bakhtiari Province, Iran. At the 2006 census, its population was 69, in 12 families. The village is populated by Lurs.
