= Teyak, Chaharmahal and Bakhtiari =

Teyak تیک
- Village
- Location within Iran
- Coordinates: 32°18′58″N 49°56′13″E
- Country: Iran
- Province: Chaharmahal and Bakhtiari
- County: Kuhrang
- Bakhsh: Bazoft
- Rural District: Bazoft

Population (2006)
  - Total: 117
- Time zone: UTC+3:30 (IRST)
  - Summer (DST): UTC+4:30 (IRDT)

Teyak (Persian: تیک) is a village in Bazoft Rural District, Bazoft District, Kuhrang County, Chaharmahal and Bakhtiari Province, Iran. At the 2006 census, its population was 117, in 23 families. The village is populated by Lurs.
