= Siyavashabad-e Gerdu =

Siyavashabad-e Gerdu سياوش ابادگردو
- Village
- Location within Iran
- Coordinates: 32°10′44″N 50°18′41″E
- Country: Iran
- Province: Chaharmahal and Bakhtiari
- County: Kuhrang
- Bakhsh: Bazoft
- Rural District: Doab

Population (2006)
  - Total: 168
- Time zone: UTC+3:30 (IRST)
  - Summer (DST): UTC+4:30 (IRDT)

Siyavashabad-e Gerdu (Persian: سياوش ابادگردو, also Romanized as Sīyāvashābād-e Gerdū) is a village in Doab Rural District, Bazoft District, Kuhrang County, Chaharmahal and Bakhtiari Province, Iran. At the 2006 census, its population was 168, in 27 families. The village is populated by Lurs.
