= Alborzabad =

Alborzabad البرزاباد
- Village
- Location within Iran
- Coordinates: 31°34′48″N 50°38′57″E
- Country: Iran
- Province: Chaharmahal and Bakhtiari
- County: Lordegan
- Bakhsh: Manj
- Rural District: Manj

Population (2006)
  - Total: 169
- Time zone: UTC+3:30 (IRST)
  - Summer (DST): UTC+4:30 (IRDT)

Alborzabad (Persian: البرزاباد, also Romanized as Alborzābād) is a village in Manj Rural District, Manj District, Lordegan County, Chaharmahal and Bakhtiari Province, Iran. At the 2006 census, its population was 169, in 30 families. The village is populated by Lurs.
