= Tavalledan =

Tavalledan تولدان
- Village
- Location within Iran
- Coordinates: 31°42′55″N 50°34′46″E
- Country: Iran
- Province: Chaharmahal and Bakhtiari
- County: Ardal
- Bakhsh: Miankuh
- Rural District: Miankuh

Population (2006)
  - Total: 331
- Time zone: UTC+3:30 (IRST)
  - Summer (DST): UTC+4:30 (IRDT)

Tavalledan (Persian: تولدان, also Romanized as Ţavalledān) is a village in Miankuh Rural District, Miankuh District, Ardal County, Chaharmahal and Bakhtiari Province, Iran. At the 2006 census, its population was 331, in 64 families. The village is populated by Lurs.
