= Tall Tak =

Tall Tak تلتاك
- Village
- Location within Iran
- Coordinates: 31°45′25″N 50°30′26″E
- Country: Iran
- Province: Chaharmahal and Bakhtiari
- County: Ardal
- Bakhsh: Miankuh
- Rural District: Miankuh

Population (2006)
  - Total: 433
- Time zone: UTC+3:30 (IRST)
  - Summer (DST): UTC+4:30 (IRDT)

Tall Tak (Persian: تلتاك, also Romanized as Tall Tāk; also known as Tall Tāg) is a village in Miankuh Rural District, Miankuh District, Ardal County, Chaharmahal and Bakhtiari Province, Iran. At the 2006 census, its population was 433, in 74 families. The village is populated by Lurs.
