= Laveh =

Laveh لاوه
- Village
- Location within Iran
- Coordinates: 32°45′54″N 49°38′08″E
- Country: Iran
- Province: Chaharmahal and Bakhtiari
- County: Kuhrang
- Bakhsh: Central
- Rural District: Miankuh-e Moguyi

Population (2006)
  - Total: 24
- Time zone: UTC+3:30 (IRST)
  - Summer (DST): UTC+4:30 (IRDT)

Laveh (Persian: لاوه, also Romanized as Lāveh; also known as Lāveh-ye Pā’īn) is a village in Miankuh-e Moguyi Rural District, in the Central District of Kuhrang County, Chaharmahal and Bakhtiari Province, Iran. At the 2006 census, its population was 24, in 4 families. The village is populated by Lurs.
