= Deh-e Baba, Chaharmahal and Bakhtiari =

Deh-e Baba ده بابا
- Village
- Country: Iran
- Province: Chaharmahal and Bakhtiari
- County: Lordegan
- Bakhsh: Khanmirza
- Rural District: Khanmirza

Population (2006)
  - Total: 249
- Time zone: UTC+3:30 (IRST)
  - Summer (DST): UTC+4:30 (IRDT)

Deh-e Baba (Persian: ده بابا, also Romanized as Deh-e Bābā) is a village in Khanmirza Rural District, Khanmirza District, Lordegan County, Chaharmahal and Bakhtiari Province, Iran. At the 2006 census, its population was 249, in 41 families. The village is populated by Lurs.
