= Bagh-e Mohammad Ali =

Bagh-e Mohammad Ali باغ محمدعلي
- Village
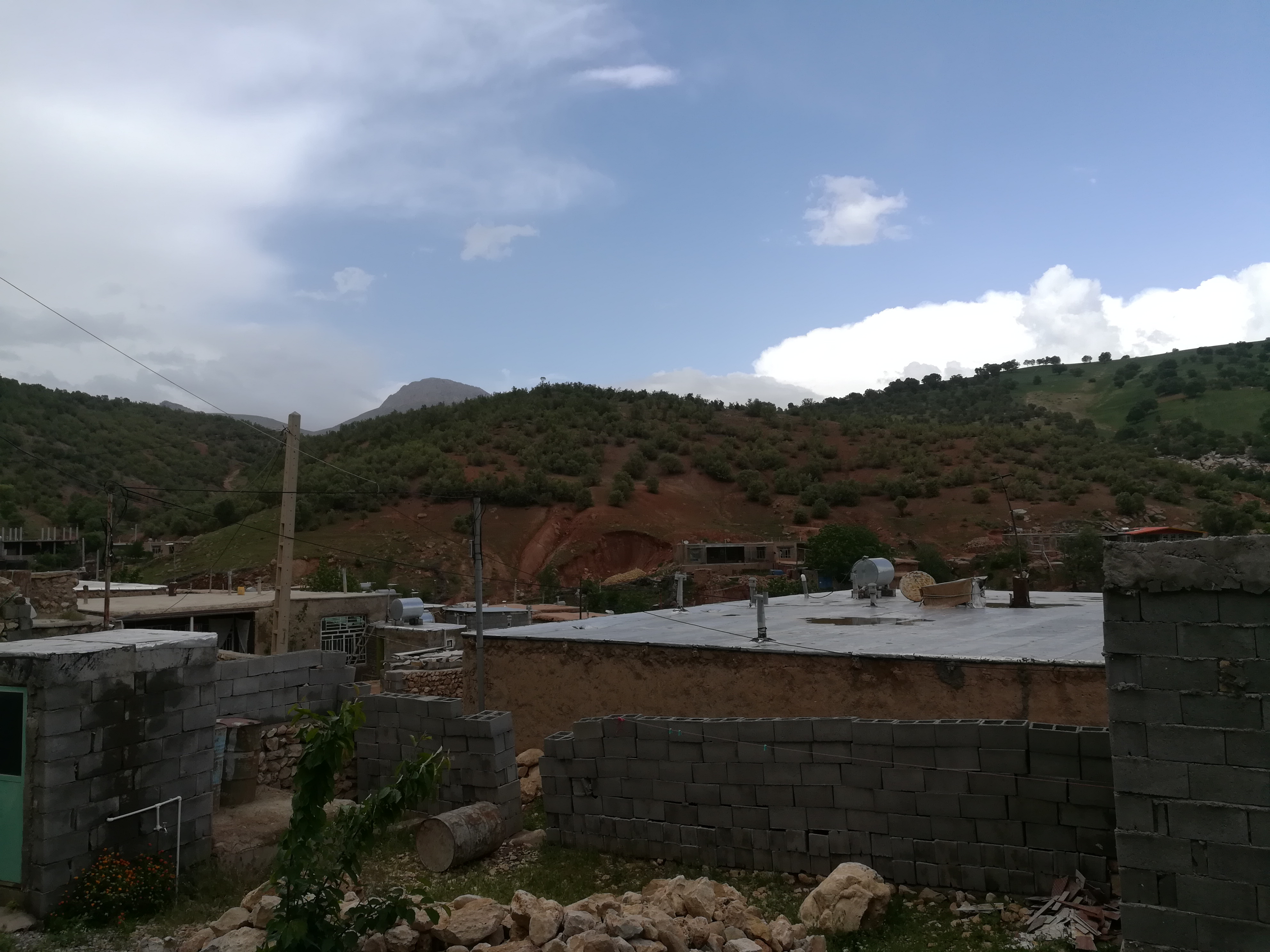
- Bagh-e Mohammad Ali

- Location within Iran
- Coordinates: 31°17′03″N 51°07′06″E
- Country: Iran
- Province: Chaharmahal and Bakhtiari
- County: Lordegan
- Bakhsh: Falard
- Rural District: Poshtkuh

Population (2006)
  - Total: 356
- Time zone: UTC+3:30 (IRST)
  - Summer (DST): UTC+4:30 (IRDT)

Bagh-e Mohammad Ali (Persian: باغ محمدعلي, also Romanized as Bāgh-e Moḩammad ‘Alī) is a village in Poshtkuh Rural District, Falard District, Lordegan County, Chaharmahal and Bakhtiari Province, Iran. At the 2006 census, its population was 356, in 80 families. The village is populated by Lurs.
