= Darreh Ru Ab =

Darreh Ru Ab دره روآب
- Village
- Location within Iran
- Coordinates: 31°25′11″N 50°40′48″E
- Country: Iran
- Province: Chaharmahal and Bakhtiari
- County: Lordegan
- Bakhsh: Central
- Rural District: Milas

Population (2006)
  - Total: 33
- Time zone: UTC+3:30 (IRST)
  - Summer (DST): UTC+4:30 (IRDT)

Darreh Ru Ab (Persian: دره روآب, also Romanized as Darreh Rū Āb; also known as Darreh Rūbāh) is a village in Milas Rural District, in the Central District of Lordegan County, Chaharmahal and Bakhtiari Province, Iran. At the 2006 census, its population was 33, in 10 families.
