= Chendeh =

Chendeh چنده
- Village
- Location within Iran
- Coordinates: 31°45′35″N 50°23′03″E
- Country: Iran
- Province: Chaharmahal and Bakhtiari
- County: Ardal
- Bakhsh: Miankuh
- Rural District: Shalil

Population (2006)
  - Total: 236
- Time zone: UTC+3:30 (IRST)
  - Summer (DST): UTC+4:30 (IRDT)

Chendeh (Persian: چنده; also known as Chand Deh) is a village in Shalil Rural District, Miankuh District, Ardal County, Chaharmahal and Bakhtiari Province, Iran. At the 2006 census, its population was 236, in 38 families.
