= Shahrak-e Barreh Mordeh =

Shahrak-e Barreh Mordeh شهرك بره مرده
- Village
- Location within Iran
- Coordinates: 31°50′00″N 50°33′57″E
- Country: Iran
- Province: Chaharmahal and Bakhtiari
- County: Kiar
- Bakhsh: Naghan
- Rural District: Mashayekh

Population (2006)
  - Total: 200
- Time zone: UTC+3:30 (IRST)
  - Summer (DST): UTC+4:30 (IRDT)

Shahrak-e Barreh Mordeh (Persian: شهرك بره مرده) is a village in Mashayekh Rural District, Naghan District, Kiar County, Chaharmahal and Bakhtiari Province, Iran. At the 2006 census, its population was 200, in 37 families. The village is populated by Lurs.
