= Chal Betan =

Chal Betan چالبتان
- Village
- Location within Iran
- Coordinates: 31°30′50″N 50°48′10″E
- Country: Iran
- Province: Chaharmahal and Bakhtiari
- County: Lordegan
- Bakhsh: Central
- Rural District: Milas

Population (2006)
  - Total: 354
- Time zone: UTC+3:30 (IRST)
  - Summer (DST): UTC+4:30 (IRDT)

Chal Betan (Persian: چالبتان, also Romanized as Chāl Betān and Chalbatan) is a village in Milas Rural District, in the Central District of Lordegan County, Chaharmahal and Bakhtiari Province, Iran. At the 2006 census, its population was 354, in 74 families.
