= Darreh Qahti =

Darreh Qahti دره قحطي
- Village
- Location within Iran
- Coordinates: 31°43′02″N 50°35′08″E
- Country: Iran
- Province: Chaharmahal and Bakhtiari
- County: Ardal
- Bakhsh: Miankuh
- Rural District: Miankuh

Population (2006)
  - Total: 155
- Time zone: UTC+3:30 (IRST)
  - Summer (DST): UTC+4:30 (IRDT)

Darreh Qahti (Persian: دره قحطي, also Romanized as Darreh Qaḥṭī; also known as Darreh Qa‘ţī) is a village in Miankuh Rural District, Miankuh District, Ardal County, Chaharmahal and Bakhtiari province, Iran. At the 2006 census, its population was 155, in 31 families.
