= Karch-e Sofla =

Karch-e Sofla كرچ سفلى
- Village
- Location within Iran
- Coordinates: 31°54′21″N 50°43′39″E
- Country: Iran
- Province: Chaharmahal and Bakhtiari
- County: Kiar
- Bakhsh: Naghan
- Rural District: Naghan
- Time zone: UTC+3:30 (IRST)
  - Summer (DST): UTC+4:30 (IRDT)

Karch-e Sofla (Persian: كرچ سفلى, also Romanized as Karch-e Soflá) is a village in Naghan Rural District, Naghan District, Kiar County, Chaharmahal and Bakhtiari Province, Iran. At the 2006 census, its existence was noted, but its population was not reported. The village is populated by Lurs.
