= Shahrak-e Kazamiyeh =

Shahrak-e Kazamiyeh شهرک کاظميه
- Village
- Country: Iran
- Province: Chaharmahal and Bakhtiari
- County: Ardal
- Bakhsh: Miankuh
- Rural District: Miankuh

Population (2006)
  - Total: 274
- Time zone: UTC+3:30 (IRST)
  - Summer (DST): UTC+4:30 (IRDT)

Shahrak-e Kazamiyeh (Persian: شهرک کاظميه, also Romanized as Shahrak-e Kāẓamīyeh) is a village in Miankuh Rural District, Miankuh District, Ardal County, Chaharmahal and Bakhtiari Province, Iran. At the 2006 census, its population was 274, in 46 families. The village is populated by Lurs.
