= Shah Abd ol Azim =

Shah Abd ol Azim شاه عبدالعظيم
- Village
- Location within Iran
- Coordinates: 32°18′23″N 50°15′19″E
- Country: Iran
- Province: Chaharmahal and Bakhtiari
- County: Kuhrang
- Bakhsh: Central
- Rural District: Shurab-e Tangazi

Population (2006)
  - Total: 21
- Time zone: UTC+3:30 (IRST)
  - Summer (DST): UTC+4:30 (IRDT)

Shah Abd ol Azim (Persian: شاه عبدالعظيم, also Romanized as Shāh ‘Abd ol ‘Az̧īm) is a village in Shurab-e Tangazi Rural District, in the Central District of Kuhrang County, Chaharmahal and Bakhtiari Province, Iran. At the 2006 census, its population was 21, in 6 families.
