= Loshtar-e Gavaruyi =

Loshtar-e Gavaruyi لشترگوروئي
- Village
- Location within Iran
- Coordinates: 32°02′24″N 50°17′55″E
- Country: Iran
- Province: Chaharmahal and Bakhtiari
- County: Ardal
- Bakhsh: Central
- Rural District: Dinaran

Population (2006)
  - Total: 187
- Time zone: UTC+3:30 (IRST)
  - Summer (DST): UTC+4:30 (IRDT)

Loshtar-e Gavaruyi (Persian: لشترگوروئي, also Romanized as Loshtar-e Gavarūyī; also known as Loshter, Lowshter, and Lūshtar) is a village in Dinaran Rural District, in the Central District of Ardal County, Chaharmahal and Bakhtiari Province, Iran. At the 2006 census, its population was 187, in 31 families. The village is populated by Lurs.
