= Vaz-e Gagangarestan =

Vaz-e Gagangarestan وزگاگنگرستان
- Village
- Country: Iran
- Province: Chaharmahal and Bakhtiari
- County: Kuhrang
- Bakhsh: Bazoft
- Rural District: Doab

Population (2006)
  - Total: 30
- Time zone: UTC+3:30 (IRST)
  - Summer (DST): UTC+4:30 (IRDT)

Vaz-e Gagangarestan (Persian: وزگاگنگرستان, also romanized as Vaz-e Gāgangarestān) is a village in Doab Rural District, Bazoft District, Kuhrang County, Chaharmahal and Bakhtiari Province, Iran. At the 2006 census, its population was 30, in 5 families. The village is populated by Lurs.
