= Abbas-e Aliabad =

Abbas-e Aliabad عباسعلي اباد
- Village
- Location within Iran
- Coordinates: 32°26′13″N 50°20′02″E
- Country: Iran
- Province: Chaharmahal and Bakhtiari
- County: Kuhrang
- Bakhsh: Central
- Rural District: Dasht-e Zarrin

Population (2006)
  - Total: 18
- Time zone: UTC+3:30 (IRST)
  - Summer (DST): UTC+4:30 (IRDT)

Abbas-e Aliabad (Persian: عباسعلي اباد, also Romanized as ʿAbbās-e ʿAlīābād) is a village in Dasht-e Zarrin Rural District, in the Central District of Kuhrang County, Chaharmahal and Bakhtiari Province, Iran. At the 2006 census, its population was 18, in 5 families. The village is populated by Lurs.
