= Baled =

Baled بالد
- Village
- Location within Iran
- Coordinates: 31°56′10″N 50°32′24″E
- Country: Iran
- Province: Chaharmahal and Bakhtiari
- County: Ardal
- Bakhsh: Central
- Rural District: Poshtkuh

Population (2006)
  - Total: 265
- Time zone: UTC+3:30 (IRST)
  - Summer (DST): UTC+4:30 (IRDT)

Baled (Persian: بالد, also Romanized as Bāled) is a village in Poshtkuh Rural District, in the Central District of Ardal County, Chaharmahal and Bakhtiari Province, Iran. At the 2006 census, its population was 265, in 52 families. The village is populated by Lurs.
