= Nazak =

Nazak نازک
- Village
- Location within Iran
- Coordinates: 31°41′45″N 50°48′44″E
- Country: Iran
- Province: Chaharmahal and Bakhtiari
- County: Khanmirza
- Bakhsh: Armand
- Rural District: Sepidar

Population (2016)
  - Total: 27
- Time zone: UTC+3:30 (IRST)

Nazak (Persian: نازک, also Romanized as Nāzak) is a village in Sepidar Rural District, in Armand District of Khanmirza County, Chaharmahal and Bakhtiari Province, Iran. At the 2016 census, its population was 27 , in 10 families.
