= Ab Talkhak =

Ab Talkhak اب تلخک
- Village
- Location within Iran
- Coordinates: 31°42′03″N 50°36′33″E
- Country: Iran
- Province: Chaharmahal and Bakhtiari
- County: Ardal
- Bakhsh: Miankuh
- Rural District: Miankuh

Population (2006)
  - Total: 115
- Time zone: UTC+3:30 (IRST)
  - Summer (DST): UTC+4:30 (IRDT)

Ab Talkhak (Persian: اب تلخک, also Romanized as Āb Talkhak; also known as Ābtalkhak) is a village in Miankuh Rural District, Miankuh District, Ardal County, Chaharmahal and Bakhtiari province, Iran. At the 2006 census, its population was 115, in 27 families. The village is populated by Lurs.
