= Sang-e Bil =

Sang-e Bil سنگ بيل
- Village
- Location within Iran
- Coordinates: 31°59′47″N 50°36′55″E
- Country: Iran
- Province: Chaharmahal and Bakhtiari
- County: Ardal
- Bakhsh: Central
- Rural District: Poshtkuh

Population (2006)
  - Total: 17
- Time zone: UTC+3:30 (IRST)
  - Summer (DST): UTC+4:30 (IRDT)

Sang-e Bil (Persian: سنگ بيل, also Romanized as Sang-e Bīl and Sang va Bīl) is a village in Poshtkuh Rural District, in the Central District of Ardal County, Chaharmahal and Bakhtiari Province, Iran. At the 2006 census, its population was 17, in 4 families.
