= Bagh Kaj =

Bagh Kaj باغ كاج
- Village
- Location within Iran
- Coordinates: 31°12′26″N 51°07′49″E
- Country: Iran
- Province: Chaharmahal and Bakhtiari
- County: Lordegan
- Bakhsh: Falard
- Rural District: Poshtkuh

Population (2006)
  - Total: 247
- Time zone: UTC+3:30 (IRST)
  - Summer (DST): UTC+4:30 (IRDT)

Bagh Kaj (Persian: باغ كاج, also Romanized as Bāgh Kāj and Bāgh-e Kāj) is a village in Poshtkuh Rural District, Falard District, Lordegan County, Chaharmahal and Bakhtiari Province, Iran. At the 2006 census, its population was 247, in 51 families. The village is populated by Lurs.
