= Khunkar =

Khunkar خونكار
- Village
- Location within Iran
- Coordinates: 32°24′06″N 50°22′15″E
- Country: Iran
- Province: Chaharmahal and Bakhtiari
- County: Kuhrang
- Bakhsh: Central
- Rural District: Dasht-e Zarrin

Population (2006)
  - Total: 260
- Time zone: UTC+3:30 (IRST)
  - Summer (DST): UTC+4:30 (IRDT)

Khunkar (Persian: خونكار, also Romanized as Khūnkār) is a village in Dasht-e Zarrin Rural District, in the Central District of Kuhrang County, Chaharmahal and Bakhtiari Province, Iran. At the 2006 census, its population was 260, in 53 families. The village is populated by Lurs.
