= Chuleh Dan =

Chuleh Dan چوله دان
- Village
- Location within Iran
- Coordinates: 31°42′21″N 50°36′15″E
- Country: Iran
- Province: Chaharmahal and Bakhtiari
- County: Ardal
- Bakhsh: Miankuh
- Rural District: Miankuh

Population (2006)
  - Total: 571
- Time zone: UTC+3:30 (IRST)
  - Summer (DST): UTC+4:30 (IRDT)

Chuleh Dan (Persian: چوله دان, also Romanized as Chūleh Dān; also known as Choldān) is a village in Miankuh Rural District, Miankuh District, Ardal County, Chaharmahal and Bakhtiari Province, Iran. At the 2006 census, its population was 571, in 107 families. The village is populated by Lurs.
