= Darreh-ye Quti =

Village in Chaharmahal and Bakhtiari, Iran

Darreh-ye Quti دره قوطي
- Village
- Location within Iran
- Coordinates: 31°32′29″N 50°29′34″E
- Country: Iran
- Province: Chaharmahal and Bakhtiari
- County: Lordegan
- Bakhsh: Manj
- Rural District: Barez

Population (2006)
  - Total: 109
- Time zone: UTC+3:30 (IRST)
  - Summer (DST): UTC+4:30 (IRDT)

Darreh-ye Quti (Persian: دره قوطي, also Romanized as Darreh-ye Qūṭī; also known as Darreh-ye Qaṭī) is a village in Barez Rural District, Manj District, Lordegan County, Chaharmahal and Bakhtiari Province, Iran. At the 2006 census, its population was 109, in 22 families. The village is populated by Lurs.
