= Eshgaftak =

Eshgaftak اشگفتك
- Village
- Location within Iran
- Coordinates: 32°22′02″N 50°47′59″E
- Country: Iran
- Province: Chaharmahal and Bakhtiari
- County: Shahrekord
- Bakhsh: Central
- Rural District: Howmeh

Population (2006)
  - Total: 3,891
- Time zone: UTC+3:30 (IRST)
  - Summer (DST): UTC+4:30 (IRDT)

Eshgaftak (Persian: اشگفتك; also known as Eshkaftak) is a village in Howmeh Rural District, in the Central District of Shahrekord County, Chaharmahal and Bakhtiari Province, Iran. At the 2006 census, its population was 3,891, in 1,014 families.
