= Tagarg Ab =

Tagarg Ab تگرگ اب
- Village
- Location within Iran
- Coordinates: 31°42′10″N 51°16′16″E
- Country: Iran
- Province: Chaharmahal and Bakhtiari
- County: Borujen
- Bakhsh: Gandoman
- Rural District: Dowrahan

Population (2006)
  - Total: 119
- Time zone: UTC+3:30 (IRST)
  - Summer (DST): UTC+4:30 (IRDT)

Tagarg Ab (Persian: تگرگ اب, also Romanized as Tagarg Āb) is a village in Dowrahan Rural District, Gandoman District, Borujen County, Chaharmahal and Bakhtiari Province, Iran. At the 2006 census, its population was 119, in 22 families. The village is populated by Lurs and speakers of a distinct Turkic dialect.
