= Charmineh =

Charmineh چرمينه
- Village
- Location within Iran
- Coordinates: 31°52′19″N 51°05′33″E
- Country: Iran
- Province: Chaharmahal and Bakhtiari
- County: Borujen
- Bakhsh: Gandoman
- Rural District: Gandoman

Population (2006)
  - Total: 30
- Time zone: UTC+3:30 (IRST)
  - Summer (DST): UTC+4:30 (IRDT)

Charmineh (Persian: چرمينه, also Romanized as Charmīneh and Charmīnah) is a village in Gandoman Rural District, Gandoman District, Borujen County, Chaharmahal and Bakhtiari Province, Iran. At the 2006 census, its population was 30, in 9 families. The village is populated by Lurs.
