= Yurd Sukhteh =

Yurd Sukhteh يوردسوخته
- Village
- Location within Iran
- Coordinates: 31°18′16″N 51°12′22″E
- Country: Iran
- Province: Chaharmahal and Bakhtiari
- County: Lordegan
- Bakhsh: Falard
- Rural District: Falard

Population (2006)
  - Total: 130
- Time zone: UTC+3:30 (IRST)
  - Summer (DST): UTC+4:30 (IRDT)

Yurd Sukhteh (Persian: يوردسوخته, also Romanized as Yūrd Sūkhteh; also known as Yard Sūkhteh) is a village in Falard Rural District, Falard District, Lordegan County, Chaharmahal and Bakhtiari Province, Iran. At the 2006 census, its population was 130, in 20 families. The village is populated by Lurs.
