= Pol Barez =

Pol Barez پل بارز
- Village
- Location within Iran
- Coordinates: 31°31′12″N 50°24′21″E
- Country: Iran
- Province: Chaharmahal and Bakhtiari
- County: Lordegan
- Bakhsh: Manj
- Rural District: Barez

Population (2006)
  - Total: 181
- Time zone: UTC+3:30 (IRST)
  - Summer (DST): UTC+4:30 (IRDT)

Pol Barez (Persian: پل بارز, also Romanized as Pol Bārez) is a village in Barez Rural District, Manj District, Lordegan County, Chaharmahal and Bakhtiari Province, Iran. At the 2006 census, its population was 181, in 39 families. The village is populated by Lurs.
