= Gerdopineh =

Gerdopineh گردپينه
- Village
- Location within Iran
- Coordinates: 32°03′14″N 50°24′12″E
- Country: Iran
- Province: Chaharmahal and Bakhtiari
- County: Ardal
- Bakhsh: Central
- Rural District: Dinaran

Population (2006)
  - Total: 535
- Time zone: UTC+3:30 (IRST)
  - Summer (DST): UTC+4:30 (IRDT)

Gerdopineh (Persian: گردپينه, also romanized as Gerdopīneh and Gerdpīneh) is a village in Dinaran Rural District, in the Central District of Ardal County, Chaharmahal and Bakhtiari Province, Iran. At the 2006 census, its population was 535, in 97 families. The village is populated by Lurs.
