= Lakhoshk, Chaharmahal and Bakhtiari =

Lakhoshk لاخشك
- Village
- Location within Iran
- Coordinates: 32°02′39″N 50°21′57″E
- Country: Iran
- Province: Chaharmahal and Bakhtiari
- County: Ardal
- Bakhsh: Central
- Rural District: Dinaran

Population (2006)
  - Total: 55
- Time zone: UTC+3:30 (IRST)
  - Summer (DST): UTC+4:30 (IRDT)

Lakhoshk (Persian: لاخشك, also Romanized as Lākhoshk) is a village in Dinaran Rural District, in the Central District of Ardal County, Chaharmahal and Bakhtiari Province, Iran. At the 2006 census, its population was 55, in 8 families. The village is populated by Lurs.
