= Banuastaki =

Banuasnaki بنواسنكی
- Village
- Location within Iran
- Coordinates: 32°34′23″N 50°12′18″E
- Country: Iran
- Province: Chaharmahal and Bakhtiari
- County: Kuhrang
- Bakhsh: Central
- Rural District: Shurab-e Tangazi

Population (2006)
  - Total: 48
- Time zone: UTC+3:30 (IRST)
  - Summer (DST): UTC+4:30 (IRDT)

Banuasnaki (Persian: بنواسنكی, also Romanized as Banūāsnakī; also known as Banūāsnakī) is a village in Shurab-e Tangazi Rural District, in the Central District of Kuhrang County, Chaharmahal and Bakhtiari Province, Iran. At the 2006 census, its population was 48, in 10 families. The village is populated by Lurs.
