= Cham-e Khorram =

Cham-e Khorram چم خرم
- Village
- Location within Iran
- Coordinates: 32°27′56″N 50°57′08″E
- Country: Iran
- Province: Chaharmahal and Bakhtiari
- County: Saman
- Rural District: Saman

Population (2006)
  - Total: 160
- Time zone: UTC+3:30 (IRST)
  - Summer (DST): UTC+4:30 (IRDT)

Cham-e Khorram (Persian: چم خرم, also Romanized as Cham-e Khorram and Cham Khorram) is a village in Saman Rural District, Saman County, Chaharmahal and Bakhtiari Province, Iran. At the 2006 census, its population was 160, in 42 families. The village is populated by Turkic people.
