= Katak, Iran =

Katak or Kotok or Kotk or Kotak or Kotek (Persian: كتك) may refer to:

- Katak, Chaharmahal and Bakhtiari
- Katak-e Olya, Chaharmahal and Bakhtiari Province
- Katak-e Sofla, Chaharmahal and Bakhtiari Province
- Katak, Arsanjan, Fars Province
- Katak, Firuzabad, Fars Province
- Katak, Lamerd, Fars Province
- Katak, Gilan
- Kotk, Kerman
- Katak, Khuzestan
- Kotak, Kohgiluyeh and Boyer-Ahmad
- Katak, Kurdistan

== Persons ==
- Alan Kotok (1941–2006), American computer scientist

== See also ==
- Kotak (disambiguation)
