= Deh Bagh =

Deh Bagh or Deh-e Bagh (Persian: ده باغ) may refer to:

- Deh Bagh, Borujen, Chaharmahal and Bakhtiari Province
- Deh-e Bagh, Lordegan, Chaharmahal and Bakhtiari Province
- Deh Bagh, Kerman
- Deh Bagh, Kermanshah
- Deh Bagh, Kuzaran, Kermanshah Province
- Deh Bagh, Ravansar, Kermanshah Province
- Deh Bagh, Razavi Khorasan
