= Gandoman (disambiguation) =

Gandoman is a city in Chaharmahal and Bakhtiari Province, Iran.

Gandoman (Persian: گندمان) may also refer to:

- Gandoman, Baneh, Kurdistan Province
- Gandoman, Sanandaj, Kurdistan Province
- Gandoman, West Azerbaijan
- Gandoman District, in Chaharmahal and Bakhtiari Province
- Gandoman Rural District, in Chaharmahal and Bakhtiari Province
