= Konarak =

Konarak may refer to:

== Places ==
=== Iran ===
- Konarak, Iran, a city in Sistan and Baluchestan Province
- Konarak, Iranshahr, a village in Sistan and Baluchestan Province
- Konarak-e Beyahi, a village in Hormozgan Province
- Konarak-e Bala, a village in Chaharmahal and Bakhtiari Province
- Konarak-e Pain, a village in Chaharmahal and Bakhtiari Province
- Konarak County, an administrative subdivision of Iran

=== India ===
- Konark, or Konarak, Orissa
  - Konark Sun Temple

== Other uses ==
- IRIS Konarak, a vessel of the Iranian Navy
