= Serai Lashkari Khan =

Historical inn in Punjab, India

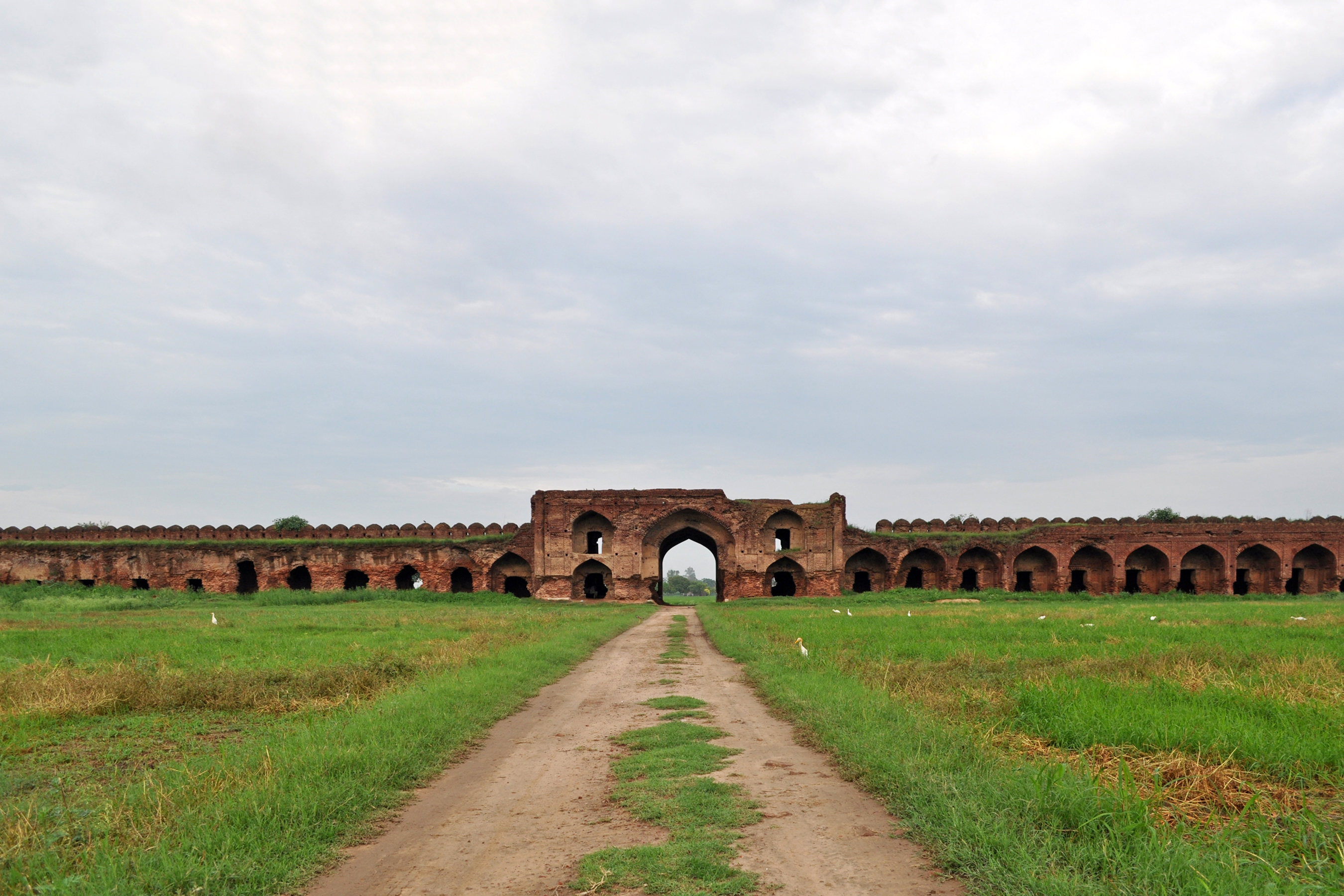
- Serai Lashkari Khan

- Location within Punjab Location within India
- 30°45′18″N 76°05′24″E
- Type: Caravanserai
- Location: Kot Panaich, Ludhiana District, Punjab, India

History
- Built: 1078 AH (1667 AD)

Site notes
- Area: 13.36 acres (5.41 ha)
- Architectural style: Mughal

Serai Lashkari Khan located near Gurdwara Manji Sahib, Kotan (near Doraha) in Ludhiana District, Punjab, India is a historical inn, or caravanserai, built by Mughal military general Lashkari Khan in 1667 CE, during the reign of Emperor Aurangzeb.

== History ==
A specimen of major structural types of Islamic architecture, this is one of many caravanserais meant to be halting places along the old Mughal highway connecting Agra, Delhi and Lahore. These caravanserais played an important role in economic, cultural and political life but gradually fell in disuse with shifting routes and advent of railroads in the nineteenth century. Many of these disappeared altogether due to modernization and urban expansion.

The historic inn, though declared as a protected monument, has largely been neglected and has been in a dilapidated condition.

== In popular media ==
This caravanserai became widely known after it was featured in the popular movie Rang De Basanti, known by the acronym RDB. Some tourists started referring to it as the "RDB fort".

== See also ==
- Mughal Serai, Doraha
- Tourism in Punjab, India
