= Eslamabad, Borujen =

Eslamabad اسلام اباد
- Village
- Country: Iran
- Province: Chaharmahal and Bakhtiari
- County: Borujen
- Bakhsh: Central
- Rural District: Howmeh

Population (2006)
  - Total: 789
- Time zone: UTC+3:30 (IRST)
  - Summer (DST): UTC+4:30 (IRDT)

Eslamabad (Persian: اسلام اباد, also Romanized as Eslāmābād) is a village in Howmeh Rural District, in the Central District of Borujen County, Chaharmahal and Bakhtiari Province, Iran. At the 2006 census, its population was 789, in 174 families.
