= Nasirabad, Borujen =

Nasirabad نصيراباد
- Village
- Location within Iran
- Coordinates: 31°48′16″N 51°05′17″E
- Country: Iran
- Province: Chaharmahal and Bakhtiari
- County: Borujen
- Bakhsh: Gandoman
- Rural District: Gandoman

Population (2006)
  - Total: 511
- Time zone: UTC+3:30 (IRST)
  - Summer (DST): UTC+4:30 (IRDT)

Nasirabad (Persian: نصيراباد, also Romanized as Naşīrābād; also known as Nāserābād) is a village in Gandoman Rural District, Gandoman District, Borujen County, Chaharmahal and Bakhtiari Province, Iran. At the 2025 census, its population is 1024 , in 321 families. The village is populated by Lurs. The village is placed on a historical hill that was the castle of sassanid magistrate there, and now few things remain of the castle
