= Sena Jan =

Sena Jan سناجان
- Village
- Location within Iran
- Coordinates: 31°52′58″N 51°05′21″E
- Country: Iran
- Province: Chaharmahal and Bakhtiari
- County: Borujen
- Bakhsh: Gandoman
- Rural District: Gandoman

Population (2006)
  - Total: 178
- Time zone: UTC+3:30 (IRST)
  - Summer (DST): UTC+4:30 (IRDT)

Sena Jan (Persian: سناجان, also Romanized as Senā Jān; also known as Sanāgān, Sinagūn, and Sīneh Gūm) is a village in Gandoman Rural District, Gandoman District, Borujen County, Chaharmahal and Bakhtiari Province, Iran. At the 2006 census, its population was 178, in 52 families. The village is populated by Lurs.
