= Deh Tut =

Deh Tut (Persian: ده توت) may refer to:

- Deh Tut, Chaharmahal and Bakhtiari
- Deh Tut, Kermanshah
- Deh Tut, Kohgiluyeh and Boyer-Ahmad
