= Doraha =

Doraha means crossroads in Hindi, Urdu and Punjabi languages. It may refer to:

== Places ==
- Doraha, Ludhiana, a city in Ludhiana district, Punjab, India
  - Mughal Serai, Doraha, caravanserai
  - Doraha railway station
- Doraha, Sehore, a village in Sehore district, Madhya Pradesh, India

== Entertainment ==
- Doraha (TV series), a Pakistani drama television series
- Doraha (film), a 1967 Pakistani Urdu black and white film

== See also ==
- Dowrahan (disambiguation)
