= Gerd Bisheh =

Gerd Bisheh or Gardbisheh or Gerd-e Bisheh (Persian: گردبيشه) may refer to:

- Gerd Bisheh, Chaharmahal and Bakhtiari
- Gerd Bisheh, Khuzestan
- Gerd Bisheh, Haftgel, Khuzestan Province
