= Katak-e Sofla =

Katak-e Sofla كتك سفلي
- Village
- Location within Iran
- Coordinates: 31°51′28″N 51°06′12″E
- Country: Iran
- Province: Chaharmahal and Bakhtiari
- County: Borujen
- Bakhsh: Gandoman
- Rural District: Gandoman

Population (2006)
  - Total: 37
- Time zone: UTC+3:30 (IRST)
  - Summer (DST): UTC+4:30 (IRDT)

Katak-e Sofla (Persian: كتك سفلي, also Romanized as Katak-e Soflá; also known as Katak-e Pā’īn) is a village in Gandoman Rural District, Gandoman District, Borujen County, Chaharmahal and Bakhtiari Province, Iran. At the 2006 census, its population was 37, in 9 families. The village is populated by Lurs.
