= Bizh Gerd =

Village in Chaharmahal and Bakhtiari province, Iran

Bizh Gerd Persian: بيژگرد
- Village
- Location within Iran
- Coordinates: 31°46′52″N 51°11′23″E
- Country: Iran
- Province: Chaharmahal and Bakhtiari
- County: Borujen
- District: Gandoman
- Rural District: Gandoman

Population (2016)
  - Total: 572
- Time zone: UTC+3:30 (IRST)

Bizh Gerd (Persian: بيژگرد) (Note: Also romanized as Bīzh Gerd) is a village in Gandoman Rural District of Gandoman District in Borujen County, Chaharmahal and Bakhtiari province, Iran.

== Demographics ==
=== Ethnicity ===
The village is populated by Lurs.

=== Population ===
At the time of the 2006 National Census, the village's population was 667 in 176 households. The following census in 2011 counted 645 people in 178 households. The 2016 census measured the population of the village as 572 people in 168 households.

== Climate ==
Climate data for Bizh Gerd(elevation: 2222m, 2000-2012 precipitation normals)
Month	Jan	Feb	Mar	Apr	May	Jun	Jul	Aug	Sep	Oct	Nov	Dec	Year
Average precipitation mm (inches)	51.6 (2.03)	57.7 (2.27)	60.6 (2.39)	61.1 (2.41)	7.0 (0.28)	0.7 (0.03)	0.0 (0.0)	0.2 (0.01)	0.2 (0.01)	6.1 (0.24)	59.5 (2.34)	77.9 (3.07)	382.6 (15.08)
Source: Chaharmahalmet
