= Dehnow, Borujen =

Village in Chaharmahal and Bakhtiari province, Iran

Dehnow Persian: دهنو
- Village
- Location within Iran
- Coordinates: 32°03′07″N 51°06′33″E
- Country: Iran
- Province: Chaharmahal and Bakhtiari
- County: Borujen
- District: Central
- Rural District: Howmeh

Population (2016)
  - Total: 978
- Time zone: UTC+3:30 (IRST)

Dehnow (Persian: دهنو) (Note: Also romanized as Deh Now) is a village in Howmeh Rural District of the Central District in Borujen County, Chaharmahal and Bakhtiari province, Iran.

== Demographics ==
=== Language ===
The village is populated by Persians.

=== Population ===
At the time of the 2006 National Census, the village's population was 1,301 in 318 households. The following census in 2011 counted 1,219 people in 341 households. The 2016 census measured the population of the village as 978 people in 305 households. It was the most populous village in its rural district.
