= Sar Pir =

SarPir or Sar-i-Pir or Sarpir (Persian: سرپير) may refer to:

- Sar Pir, Ardal, Chaharmahal and Bakhtiari Province
- Sar Pir, Borujen, Chaharmahal and Bakhtiari Province
- Sarpir, Kurdistan
