= Deh Tut, Chaharmahal and Bakhtiari =

Deh Tut ده توت
- Village
- Location within Iran
- Coordinates: 31°38′13″N 51°11′57″E
- Country: Iran
- Province: Chaharmahal and Bakhtiari
- County: Borujen
- Bakhsh: Gandoman
- Rural District: Dowrahan

Population (2006)
  - Total: 191
- Time zone: UTC+3:30 (IRST)
  - Summer (DST): UTC+4:30 (IRDT)

Deh Tut (Persian: ده توت, also Romanized as Deh Tūt; also known as Deh Tūf) is a village in Dowrahan Rural District, Gandoman District, Borujen County, Chaharmahal and Bakhtiari Province, Iran. At the 2006 census, its population was 191, in 56 families. The village is populated by Lurs.
