= Sar Pir, Borujen =

Sar Pir سرپير
- Village
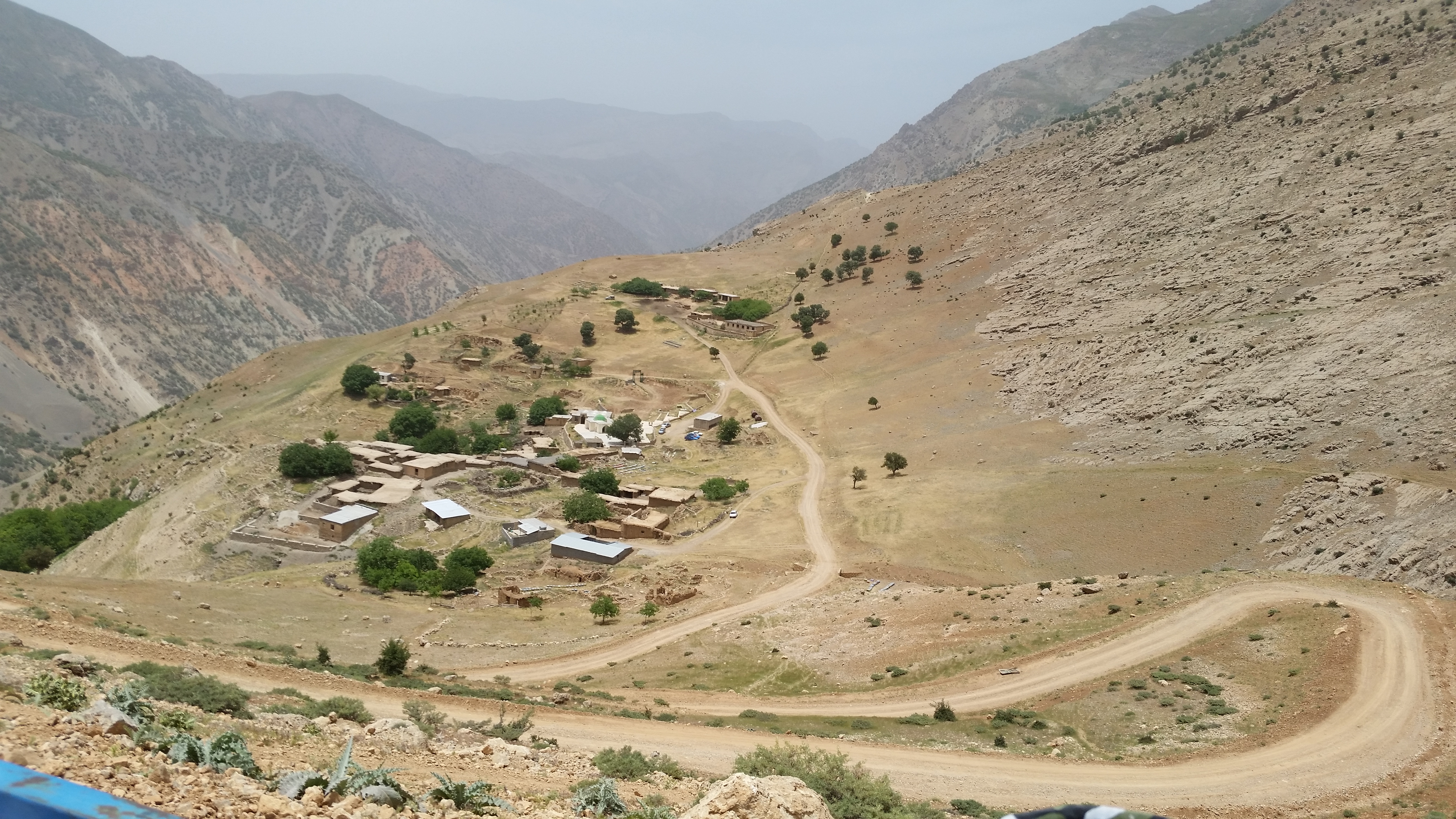

- Location within Iran
- Coordinates: 31°38′24″N 51°08′18″E
- Country: Iran
- Province: Chaharmahal and Bakhtiari
- County: Borujen
- Bakhsh: Gandoman
- Rural District: Dowrahan

Population (2006)
  - Total: 139
- Time zone: UTC+3:30 (IRST)
  - Summer (DST): UTC+4:30 (IRDT)

Sar Pir (Persian: سرپير, also Romanized as Sar Pīr) is a village in Dowrahan Rural District, Gandoman District, Borujen County, Chaharmahal and Bakhtiari Province, Iran. At the 2006 census, its population was 139, with 28 families. The village is populated by Lurs.
