= Dowrahan =

Dowrahan or Dorahan or Do Rahan (Persian: دوراهان) may refer to:

- Dowrahan, Chaharmahal and Bakhtiari
- Do Rahan, Isfahan
- Dowrahan Rural District, in Chaharmahal and Bakhtiari Province

== See also ==
- Doraha (disambiguation)
