= Emam Qeys =

Village in Chaharmahal and Bakhtiari province, Iran

Emam Qeys Persian: امام قيس
- Village
- Location within Iran
- Coordinates: 31°44′59″N 51°18′15″E
- Country: Iran
- Province: Chaharmahal and Bakhtiari
- County: Borujen
- District: Gandoman
- Rural District: Dowrahan

Population (2016)
  - Total: 2,758
- Time zone: UTC+3:30 (IRST)

Emam Qeys (Persian: امام قيس) (Note: Also romanized as Emām Qeys and Imam Qais; also known as Emāmzādeh and Imam Onis) is a village in Dowrahan Rural District of Gandoman District in Borujen County, Chaharmahal and Bakhtiari province, Iran.

== Demographics ==
=== Ethnicity ===
The village is populated by Lurs.

=== Population ===
At the time of the 2006 National Census, the village's population was 2,638 in 615 households. The following census in 2011 counted 2,813 people in 763 households. The 2016 census measured the population of the village as 2,758 people in 799 households. It was the most populous village in its rural district.

== Climate ==
Climate data for Emam Qeys (1958-2013 normals and extremes)
Month	Jan	Feb	Mar	Apr	May	Jun	Jul	Aug	Sep	Oct	Nov	Dec	Year
Record high °C (°F)	18 (64)	18 (64)	23 (73)	30 (86)	35 (95)	37 (99)	39.5 (103.1)	39.5 (103.1)	38 (100)	35 (95)	28 (82)	20 (68)	39.5 (103.1)
Mean daily maximum °C (°F)	4 (39)	7 (45)	11 (52)	17 (63)	23 (73)	28 (82)	32 (90)	31 (88)	28 (82)	21 (70)	14 (57)	7 (45)	19 (66)
Daily mean °C (°F)	−2 (28)	0 (32)	5 (41)	10 (50)	15 (59)	20 (68)	23 (73)	22 (72)	18 (64)	12 (54)	6 (43)	1 (34)	11 (52)
Mean daily minimum °C (°F)	−9 (16)	−7 (19)	−2 (28)	3 (37)	7 (45)	10 (50)	14 (57)	13 (55)	8 (46)	3 (37)	−2 (28)	−6 (21)	3 (37)
Record low °C (°F)	−29.5 (−21.1)	−27 (−17)	−19 (−2)	−11 (12)	−1 (30)	0 (32)	8 (46)	3 (37)	−4 (25)	−8 (18)	−14 (7)	−28 (−18)	−29.5 (−21.1)
Average precipitation mm (inches)	94 (3.7)	97 (3.8)	105 (4.1)	72 (2.8)	24 (0.9)	2 (0.1)	3 (0.1)	1 (0.0)	0 (0)	13 (0.5)	60 (2.4)	92 (3.6)	563 (22)
Average relative humidity (%)	69	68	58	51	42	32	31	30	31	40	54	64	48
Source: Chaharmahalmet
