= Deh Khoda =

Deh Khoda or Dehkhoda (Persian: دهخدا) may refer to:

- Dehkhoda, Chaharmahal and Bakhtiari
- Dehkhoda, Hormozgan
- Dehkhoda, Mazandaran
- Deh Khoda, Semnan
