= Konarak-e Pain =

Konarak-e Pain كنارك پائين
- Village
- Location within Iran
- Coordinates: 31°48′58″N 51°08′59″E
- Country: Iran
- Province: Chaharmahal and Bakhtiari
- County: Borujen
- Bakhsh: Gandoman
- Rural District: Gandoman

Population (2006)
  - Total: 382
- Time zone: UTC+3:30 (IRST)
  - Summer (DST): UTC+4:30 (IRDT)

Konarak-e Pain (Persian: كنارك پائين, also Romanized as Konarak-e Pā’īn, Kanārak-e Pā’īn, and Konrok Pā‘īn; also known as Konarak-e Soflá and Kanārak) is a village in Gandoman Rural District, Gandoman District, Borujen County, Chaharmahal and Bakhtiari Province, Iran. At the 2006 census, its population was 382, in 81 families. The village is populated by Lurs.
