= Deh Ali, Borujen =

Deh Ali ده علي
- Village
- Location within Iran
- Coordinates: 31°39′01″N 51°12′04″E
- Country: Iran
- Province: Chaharmahal and Bakhtiari
- County: Borujen
- Bakhsh: Gandoman
- Rural District: Dowrahan

Population (2006)
  - Total: 10
- Time zone: UTC+3:30 (IRST)
  - Summer (DST): UTC+4:30 (IRDT)

Deh Ali (Persian: ده علي, also Romanized as Deh ʿAlī; also known as Dehalī) is a village in Dowrahan Rural District, Gandoman District, Borujen County, Chaharmahal and Bakhtiari Province, Iran. At the 2006 census, its population was 10, across 5 families. The village is populated by Lurs.
