= Lah-e Deraz, Borujen =

Lah-e Deraz له دراز
- Village
- Location within Iran
- Coordinates: 31°39′06″N 51°13′53″E
- Country: Iran
- Province: Chaharmahal and Bakhtiari
- County: Borujen
- Bakhsh: Gandoman
- Rural District: Dowrahan

Population (2006)
  - Total: 171
- Time zone: UTC+3:30 (IRST)
  - Summer (DST): UTC+4:30 (IRDT)

Lah-e Deraz (Persian: له دراز, also Romanized as Lah-e Derāz, Lah Derāz, and Leh Derāz) is a village in Dowrahan Rural District, Gandoman District, Borujen County, Chaharmahal and Bakhtiari Province, Iran. At the 2006 census, its population was 171, in 55 families. The village is populated by Lurs.
