= Murchegan, Chaharmahal and Bakhtiari =

Village in Chaharmahal and Bakhtiari province, Iran

Murchegan Persian: مورچگان
- Village
- Location within Iran
- Coordinates: 31°45′19″N 51°08′15″E
- Country: Iran
- Province: Chaharmahal and Bakhtiari
- County: Borujen
- District: Gandoman
- Rural District: Gandoman

Population (2016)
  - Total: 635
- Time zone: UTC+3:30 (IRST)

Murchegan (Persian: مورچگان) (Note: Also romanized as Mūrchegān; also known as Mūrcheh Gān) is a village in Gandoman Rural District of Gandoman District in Borujen County, Chaharmahal and Bakhtiari province, Iran.

== Demographics ==
=== Ethnicity ===
The village is populated by Lurs.

=== Population ===
At the time of the 2006 National Census, the village's population was 854 in 201 households. The following census in 2011 counted 767 people in 232 households. The 2016 census measured the population of the village as 635 people in 196 households.
