= Vastegan, Chaharmahal and Bakhtiari =

Village in Chaharmahal and Bakhtiari province, Iran

Vastegan Persian: وستگان
- Village
- Location within Iran
- Coordinates: 31°45′51″N 51°06′28″E
- Country: Iran
- Province: Chaharmahal and Bakhtiari
- County: Borujen
- District: Gandoman
- Rural District: Gandoman

Population (2016)
  - Total: 514
- Time zone: UTC+3:30 (IRST)

Vastegan (Persian: وستگان) (Note: Also romanized as Vastegān; also known as Dasht-e Gūm and Dasht-i-Gūn) is a village in Gandoman Rural District of Gandoman District in Borujen County, Chaharmahal and Bakhtiari province, Iran.

== Demographics ==
=== Ethnicity ===
The village is populated by Lurs.

=== Population ===
At the time of the 2006 National Census, the village's population was 619 in 143 households. The following census in 2011 counted 587 people in 149 households. The 2016 census measured the population of the village as 514 people in 150 households.
