= Dehkhoda, Chaharmahal and Bakhtiari =

Dehkhoda ده خدا
- Village
- Location within Iran
- Coordinates: 31°34′54″N 51°12′03″E
- Country: Iran
- Province: Chaharmahal and Bakhtiari
- County: Borujen
- Bakhsh: Gandoman
- Rural District: Dowrahan

Population (2006)
  - Total: 80
- Time zone: UTC+3:30 (IRST)
  - Summer (DST): UTC+4:30 (IRDT)

Dehkhoda (Persian: ده خدا, also Romanized as Dehkhodā) is a village in Dowrahan Rural District, Gandoman District, Borujen County, Chaharmahal and Bakhtiari Province, Iran. At the 2006 census, its population was 80, in 20 families. The village is populated by Lurs.
