= Deh-e Ali =

Deh-e Ali or Deh Ali or Dehali (Persian: ده علي) may refer to:

- Deh Ali, Borujen, Chaharmahal and Bakhtiari Province
- Deh Ali, Lordegan, Chaharmahal and Bakhtiari Province
- Dehali, Fars
- Deh-e Ali, Kuhbanan, Kerman Province
- Deh-e Ali, Ravar, Kerman Province
- Deh Ali, Sirjan, Kerman Province
- Deh-e Ali, Yazd
