= Kotak =

Kotak may refer to:

- Kotak (band), an Indonesian rock band
- Kotak (surname), surname and people who bear it
- Kotak Mahindra Bank, an Indian financial service firm
- Kotak Securities, subsidiary of Kotak Mahindra Bank
- Kotak, Iran (disambiguation)
- Qal'eh-ye Kotak (Kotak Castle), a village in Iran
- Kotak Bozorg (Greater Kotak), a village in Iran

== See also ==
- Katak, Iran (disambiguation)
