= Gerd Bisheh, Chaharmahal and Bakhtiari =

Gerd Bisheh گردبيشه
- Village
- Location within Iran
- Coordinates: 31°34′34″N 51°12′04″E
- Country: Iran
- Province: Chaharmahal and Bakhtiari
- County: Borujen
- Bakhsh: Gandoman
- Rural District: Dowrahan

Population (2006)
  - Total: 47
- Time zone: UTC+3:30 (IRST)
  - Summer (DST): UTC+4:30 (IRDT)

Gerd Bisheh (Persian: گردبيشه, also Romanized as Gerd Bīsheh and Gerd-e Bīsheh; also known as Gerd Pīsheh and Gird-i-Bīsheh) is a village in Dowrahan Rural District, Gandoman District, Borujen County, Chaharmahal and Bakhtiari Province, Iran. At the 2006 census, its population was 47, in 14 families. The village is populated by Lurs.
