= Deh Bagh, Borujen =

Deh Bagh ده باغ
- Village
- Location within Iran
- Coordinates: 31°38′49″N 51°12′36″E
- Country: Iran
- Province: Chaharmahal and Bakhtiari
- County: Borujen
- Bakhsh: Gandoman
- Rural District: Dowrahan

Population (2006)
  - Total: 12
- Time zone: UTC+3:30 (IRST)
  - Summer (DST): UTC+4:30 (IRDT)

Deh Bagh (Persian: ده باغ, also Romanized as Deh Bāgh) is a village in Dowrahan Rural District, Gandoman District, Borujen County, Chaharmahal and Bakhtiari Province, Iran. At the 2006 census, its population was 12, in 5 families.
