= Kord-e Shami =

Village in Chaharmahal and Bakhtiari province, Iran

Kord-e Shami Persian: كردشامي
- Village
- Location within Iran
- Coordinates: 31°46′21″N 51°14′08″E
- Country: Iran
- Province: Chaharmahal and Bakhtiari
- County: Borujen
- District: Gandoman
- Rural District: Dowrahan

Population (2016)
  - Total: 627
- Time zone: UTC+3:30 (IRST)

Kord-e Shami (Persian: كردشامي) (Note: Also romanized as Kard Shāmī and Kord-e Shāmī; also known as Kord-e Shāhī) is a village in, and the capital of, Dowrahan Rural District in Gandoman District of Borujen County, Chaharmahal and Bakhtiari province, Iran.

== Demographics ==
=== Ethnicity ===
The village is populated by Lurs.

=== Population ===
At the time of the 2006 National Census, the village's population was 727 in 153 households. The following census in 2011 counted 640 people in 170 households. The 2016 census measured the population of the village as 627 people in 180 households.
