= Mamureh =

Village in Chaharmahal and Bakhtiari province, Iran

Mamureh Persian: معموره
- Village
- Location within Iran
- Coordinates: 31°53′25″N 51°09′15″E
- Country: Iran
- Province: Chaharmahal and Bakhtiari
- County: Borujen
- District: Gandoman
- Rural District: Gandoman

Population (2016)
  - Total: 491
- Time zone: UTC+3:30 (IRST)

Mamureh (Persian: معموره) (Note: Also romanized as Ma‘mūrah and Ma‘mūreh) is a village in Gandoman Rural District of Gandoman District in Borujen County, Chaharmahal and Bakhtiari province, Iran.

== Demographics ==
=== Ethnicity ===
The village is populated by Lurs.

=== Population ===
At the time of the 2006 National Census, the village's population was 577 in 139 households. The following census in 2011 counted 587 people in 165 households. The 2016 census measured the population of the village as 491 people in 148 households.
