= Katak-e Olya =

Katak-e Olya كتك عليا
- Village
- Location within Iran
- Coordinates: 31°51′16″N 51°06′01″E
- Country: Iran
- Province: Chaharmahal and Bakhtiari
- County: Borujen
- Bakhsh: Gandoman
- Rural District: Gandoman

Population (2006)
  - Total: 63
- Time zone: UTC+3:30 (IRST)
  - Summer (DST): UTC+4:30 (IRDT)

Katak-e Olya (Persian: كتك عليا, also Romanized as Katak-e ‘Olyā and Kotok-e ‘Olyā; also known as Katak-e Bālā and Kotok) is a village in Gandoman Rural District, Gandoman District, Borujen County, Chaharmahal and Bakhtiari Province, Iran. At the 2006 census, its population was 63, in 18 families. The village is populated by Lurs.
