= Lah-e Deraz =

Lah-e Deraz or Lah Deraz or Leh-e Deraz or Leh Deraz (Persian: له دراز) may refer to:

- Lah-e Deraz, Borujen, Chaharmahal and Bakhtiari Province
- Leh Deraz, Lordegan, Chaharmahal and Bakhtiari Province
