= Sulgan =

Village in Chaharmahal and Bakhtiari province, Iran

Sulgan Persian: سولگان
- Village
- Location within Iran
- Coordinates: 31°38′09″N 51°16′15″E
- Country: Iran
- Province: Chaharmahal and Bakhtiari
- County: Borujen
- District: Gandoman
- Rural District: Dowrahan

Population (2016)
  - Total: 244
- Time zone: UTC+3:30 (IRST)

Sulgan (Persian: سولگان) (Note: Also romanized as Sūlgān; also known as Selagūn and Sūlījān) is a village in Dowrahan Rural District of Gandoman District in Borujen County, Chaharmahal and Bakhtiari province, Iran.

== Demographics ==
=== Population ===
At the time of the 2006 National Census, the village's population was 306 in 87 households. The following census in 2011 counted 259 people in 82 households. The 2016 census measured the population of the village as 244 people in 81 households.
