= Faradonbeh Castle =

Castle in Chaharmahal and Bakhtiari Province, Iran

Faradonbeh castle
- قلعه فرادنبه
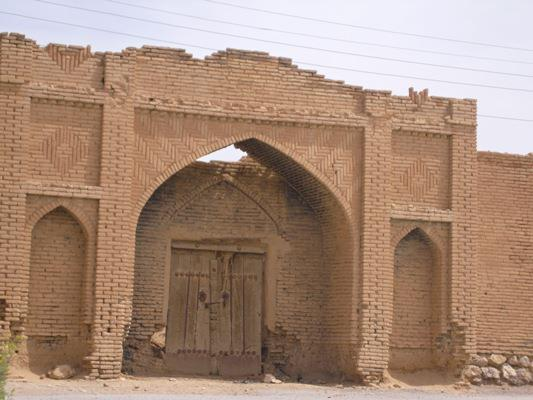
- Interactive map of the Faradonbeh castle area

General information
- Type: Castle
- Location: Borujen County, Iran
- Coordinates: 32.0113°N 51.2084°E

Faradonbeh castle (Persian: قلعه فرادنبه) is a historical castle located in Borujen County in Chaharmahal and Bakhtiari province, The longevity of this fortress dates back to the Qajar dynasty.
