= Mughal Serai, Doraha =

Caravanserai in Punjab, India

Mughal Serai
- Doraha Fort
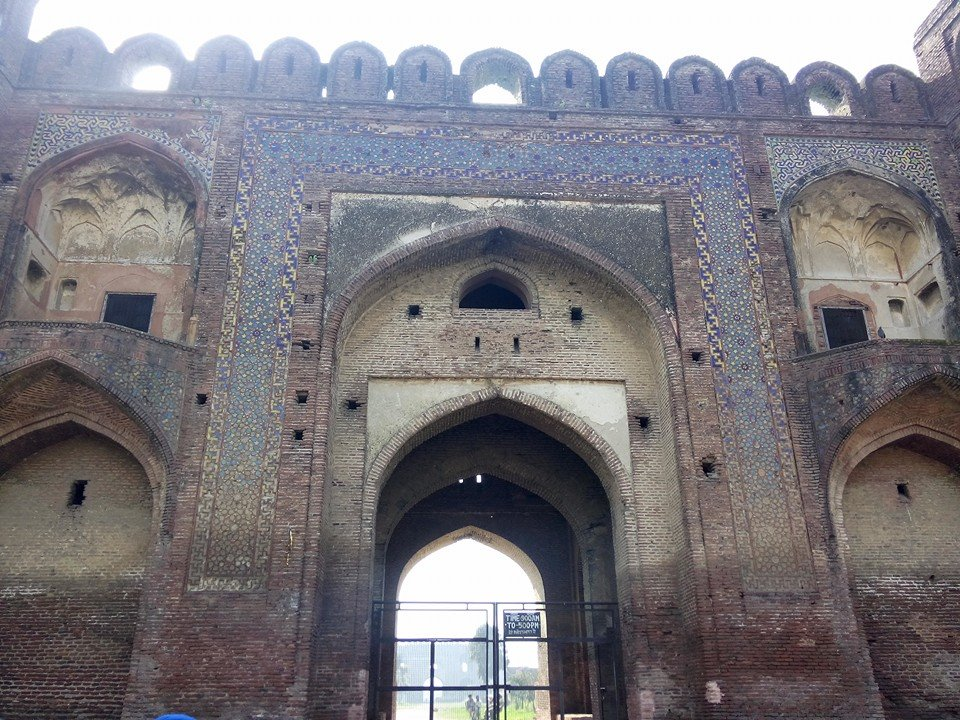
- Main gate of Doraha Serai

- Location within Punjab Location within India
- 30°47′54″N 76°01′18″E
- Type: Fort - Caravanserai
- Location: Doraha, Punjab

Site notes
- Area: 8.67 acres (3.51 ha)
- Architectural style: Mughal

Mughal Serai, Doraha is a caravanserai located at Doraha in Ludhiana District, India. Its popularly known as Mughal Caravan Serai as well as Doraha Sarai . It should not be confused with Serai Lashkari Khan, which is situated at 8–9 km (5.0–5.6 mi) away.

== History and status ==
Doraha Serai was built by the Mughal ruler Jahangir as a caravanserai, to support Mughal caravans.

Once an example of fine Mughal architecture, the serai is now in a dilapidated condition due to neglect. It is currently under the care of the government.

== Architecture ==
The Mughal Serai covers an area of 168 m^{2} (201 sq yd), with imposing gateways in the center of the northern and southern sides. The southern gate is decorated with paintings of both flora and fauna while the northern gate features solely floral designs. Both gates are connected to the 'Kaccha Pathway'.

There are about 20 rooms on northern and southern sides, and 30 on the eastern and western sides. There is also a 3-room suite. There are some areas which might have been used as Hammam, or baths, in eastern parts of the fort.

Many of the rooms have been specifically designed to admit light and facilitate ventilation of air. Most rooms are provided with slanting ventilators. The ceilings were once painted with lively colors; traces are still visible.

The western side includes the ruins of a mosque, which had also been painted in lively colours. A single-story structure adjoining the mosque may have been the Mullah's residence.

== Gallery ==
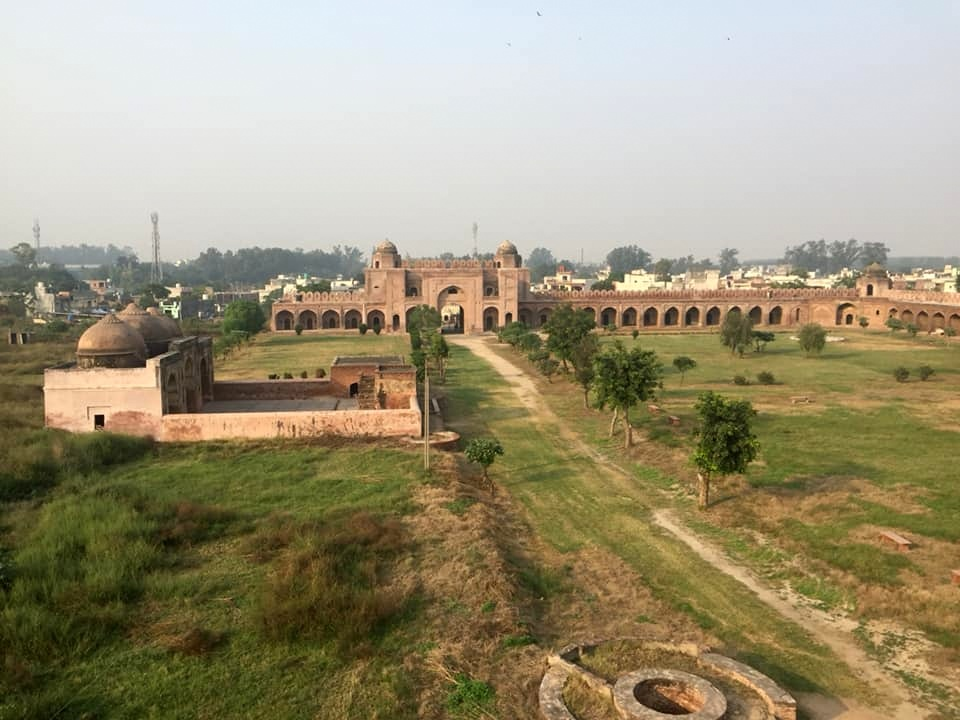
Inner view of Mughal Serai, Doraha, Ludhiana, Punjab, India.

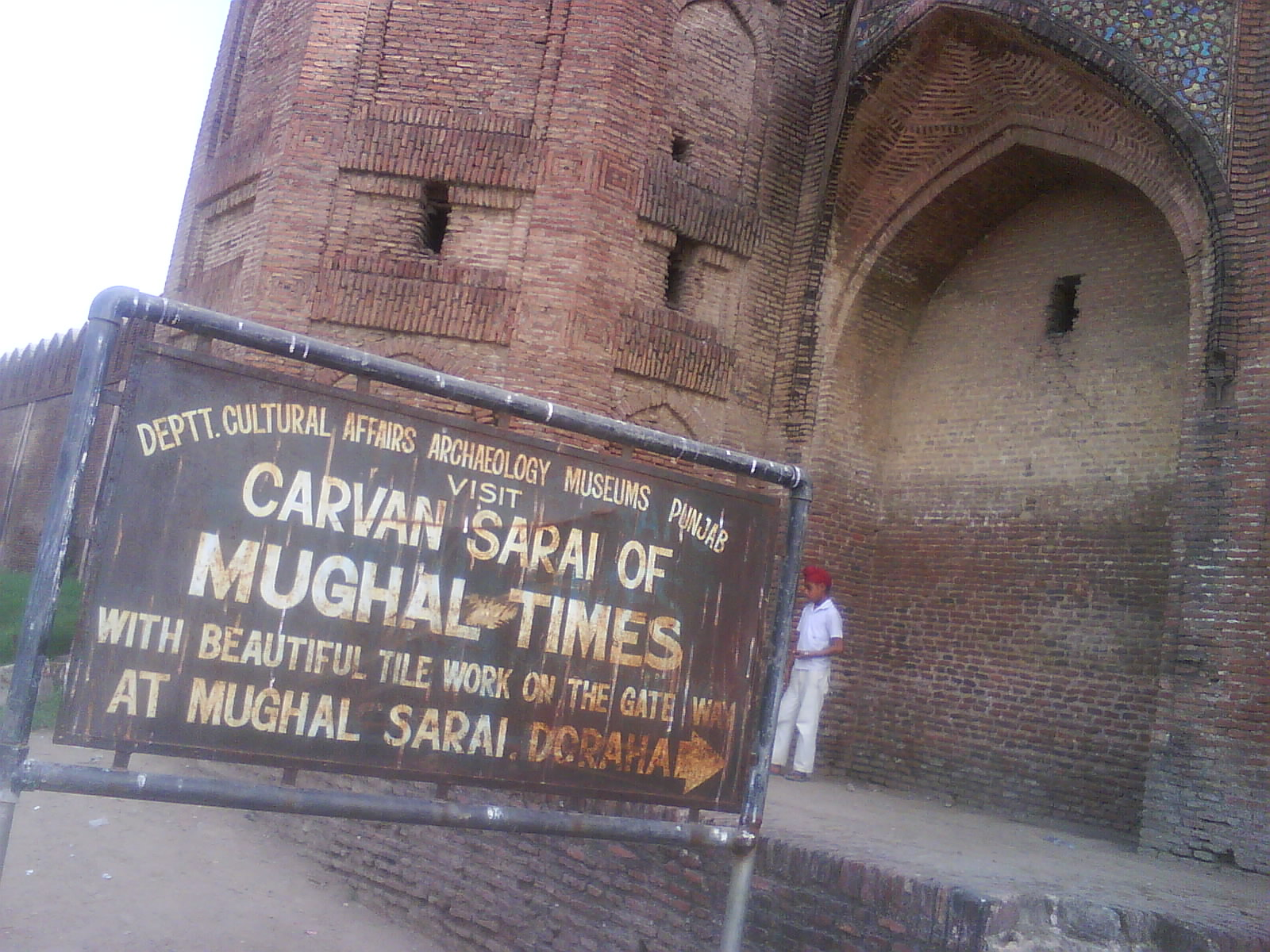
Visitor Welcome Gate at Doraha Serai.

== See also ==
- Tourism in Punjab, India
- Serai Lashkari Khan or RDB Fort
