= Dowrahan, Chaharmahal and Bakhtiari =

Village in Chaharmahal and Bakhtiari province, Iran

Dowrahan Persian: دوراهان
- Village
- Location within Iran
- Coordinates: 31°37′08″N 51°11′24″E
- Country: Iran
- Province: Chaharmahal and Bakhtiari
- County: Borujen
- District: Gandoman
- Rural District: Dowrahan

Population (2016)
  - Total: 712
- Time zone: UTC+3:30 (IRST)

Dowrahan (Persian: دوراهان) (Note: Also romanized as Dorāhān and Dowrāhān; also known as Dow Rahūn and Durāhūn) is a village in Dowrahan Rural District of Gandoman District in Borujen County, Chaharmahal and Bakhtiari province, Iran.

== Demographics ==
=== Ethnicity ===
The village is populated by Lurs.

=== Population ===
At the time of the 2006 National Census, the village's population was 829 in 215 households. The following census in 2011 counted 750 people in 221 households. The 2016 census measured the population of the village as 712 people in 207 households.
