= Konarak-e Bala =

Village in Chaharmahal and Bakhtiari province, Iran

Konarak-e Bala Persian: كنارك بالا
- Village
- Location within Iran
- Coordinates: 31°47′57″N 51°08′56″E
- Country: Iran
- Province: Chaharmahal and Bakhtiari
- County: Borujen
- District: Gandoman
- Rural District: Gandoman

Population (2016)
  - Total: 1,058
- Time zone: UTC+3:30 (IRST)

Konarak-e Bala (Persian: كنارك بالا) (Note: Also romanized as Kanārak-e Bālā, Konarak-e Bālā, and Konrok Bālā; also known as Konarak-e ‘Olyā) is a village in Gandoman Rural District of Gandoman District in Borujen County, Chaharmahal and Bakhtiari province, Iran.

== Demographics ==
=== Ethnicity ===
The village is populated by Lurs.

=== Population ===
At the time of the 2006 National Census, the village's population was 934 in 227 households. The following census in 2011 counted 1,007 people in 286 households. The 2016 census measured the population of the village as 1,058 people in 299 households. It was the most populous village in its rural district.
