= Saba Foulad Zagros =

Iranian steel re-bar manufacturing company

- Company type: Private
- Industry: Steel
- Founded: 2 December 2009 (16 years ago)
- Founder: Hamidreza Taherizadeh
- Headquarters: Tehran, Iran
- Key people: Hamidreza Taherizadeh (CEO)
- Products: Steel Re-bar
- Number of employees: 300 Direct (Dec 2014); 3000 Indirect
- Website: www.sabasteel.ir

Saba Foulad Zagros (Persian: صبا فولاد زاگرس) is an Iranian steel re-bar manufacturing company headquartered in Tehran, Iran. The company's plant is located in Sefiddasht Industrial Park in Borujen County.

== History ==
Saba Foulad Zagros was founded in December 2009 as a private company in Sefiddasht Industrial Park in Borujen County, Iran. The installation of the production line and facilities was carried out by domestic as well as foreign contractors with technical support of companies such as Siemens.

== Professional associations, awards and certifications ==
Since 2009, Saba Foulad Zagros has been a member of the Iranian Steel Producers Association and the company's CEO, Hamidreza Taherizadeh, holds the position of vice president of the association as of December 2014.

As of December 2014, Saba Foulad Zagros has received the following awards:

- Exemplary Provincial Industrial Plan (2010, 2011)
- Premier Contributor to the Development of Chaharmahal and Bakhtiari province (2013)

As of December 2014, Saba Foulad Zagros holds the following certifications:

- Institute of Standards and Industrial Research of Iran
- ISO 9001
- ISO 14001
- OHSAS 18001

== Development plan ==
The company plans to expand by launching a continuous casting plant in order to produce steel billets

== Controversy ==
In 2016 a viral YouTube post presented steel re-bar manufactured by Saba Foulad Zagros breaking with minimal force applied. It was considered too brittle, thus too dangerous to use in construction.

== See also ==
- Global steel industry trends
- Hot rolling
- Rolling mill
- Steel producers
- Steel mill
