= Faradonbeh =

City in Chaharmahal and Bakhtiari province, Iran

Faradonbeh Persian: فرادنبه
- City
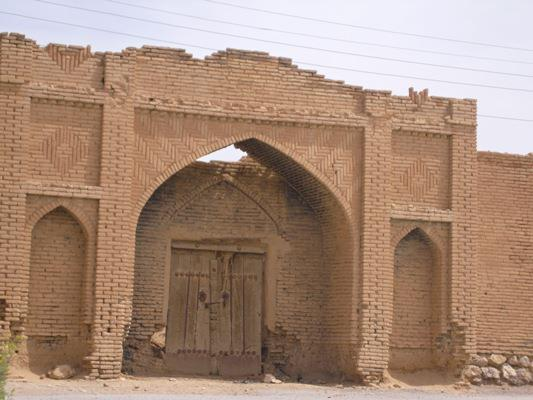
- Faradonbeh Castle

- Location within Iran
- Coordinates: 32°00′23″N 51°13′03″E
- Country: Iran
- Province: Chaharmahal and Bakhtiari
- County: Borujen
- District: Central

Population (2016)
  - Total: 13,317
- Time zone: UTC+3:30 (IRST)

Faradonbeh (Persian: فرادنبه) (Note: Also romanized as Farādonbeh; also known as Fara Dumbeh, Farādombeh, Farah Dombeh, and Parā Donbeh) is an old city in the Central District of Borujen County, Chaharmahal and Bakhtiari province, Iran.

== Demographics ==
=== Ethnicity ===
Faradonbeh is populated by Turkic people.

=== Population ===
At the time of the 2006 National Census, the city's population was 12,697 in 2,823 households. The census in 2011 counted 13,139 people in 3,435 households. The 2016 census measured the population of the city as 13,317 people in 3,808 households.
