= Manji Sahib =

Gurdwara in Punjab, India

Gurdwara Manji Sahib
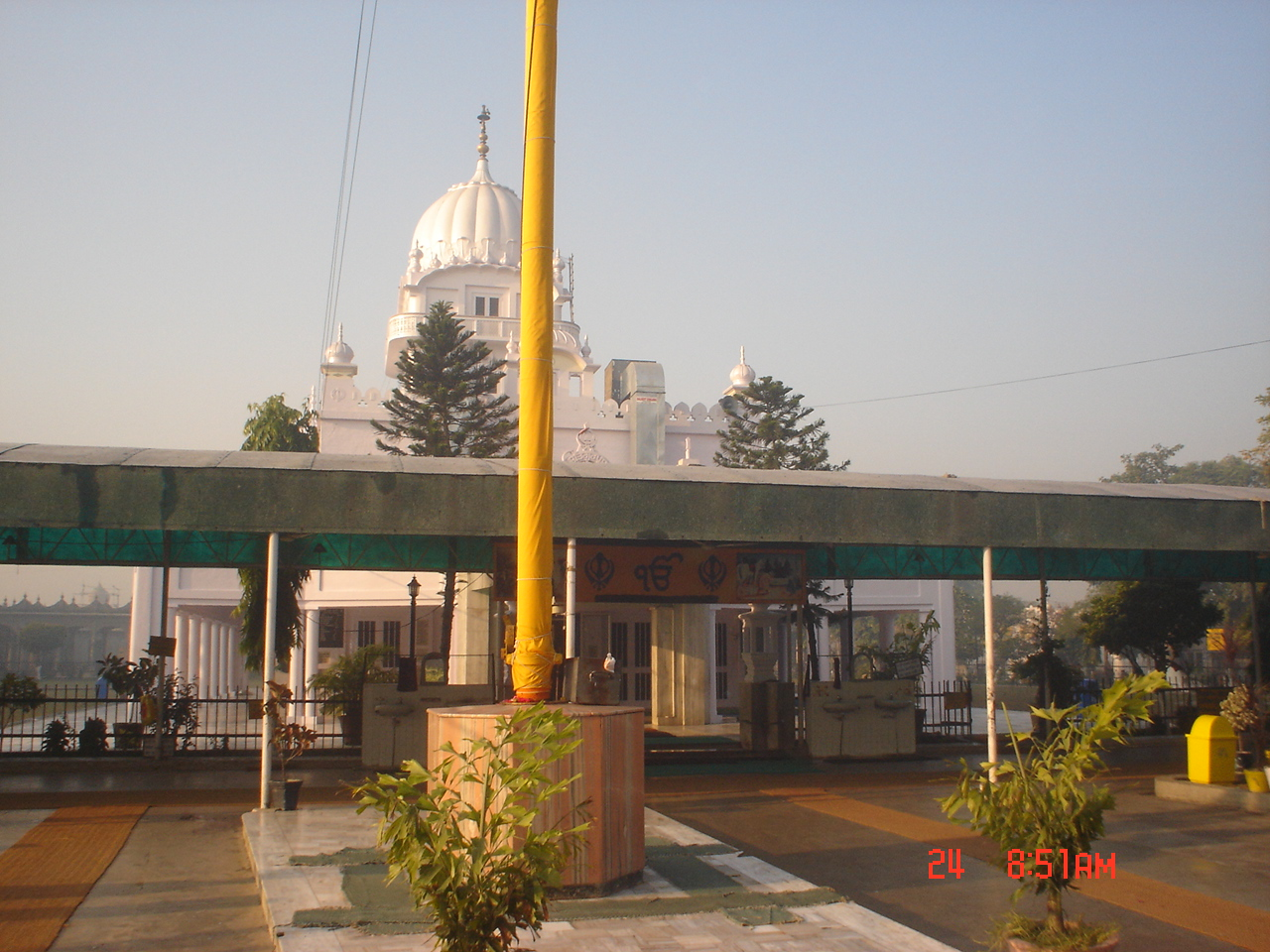
- Manji Sahib

- Location within Punjab

Religion
- Affiliation: Sikhism
- District: Ludhiana

Location
- Location: Alamgir
- State: Punjab
- Country: India
- Coordinates: 30.8107°N 75.8622°E

Architecture
- Style: Sikh architecture

Manji Sahib Gurudwara (also known as Alamgir Sahib) is located near the village of Alamgir, Ludhiana district, Punjab, India. Guru Gobind Singh, tenth guru of the Sikhs, stayed here for a short while.

== Gurdwara gallery ==
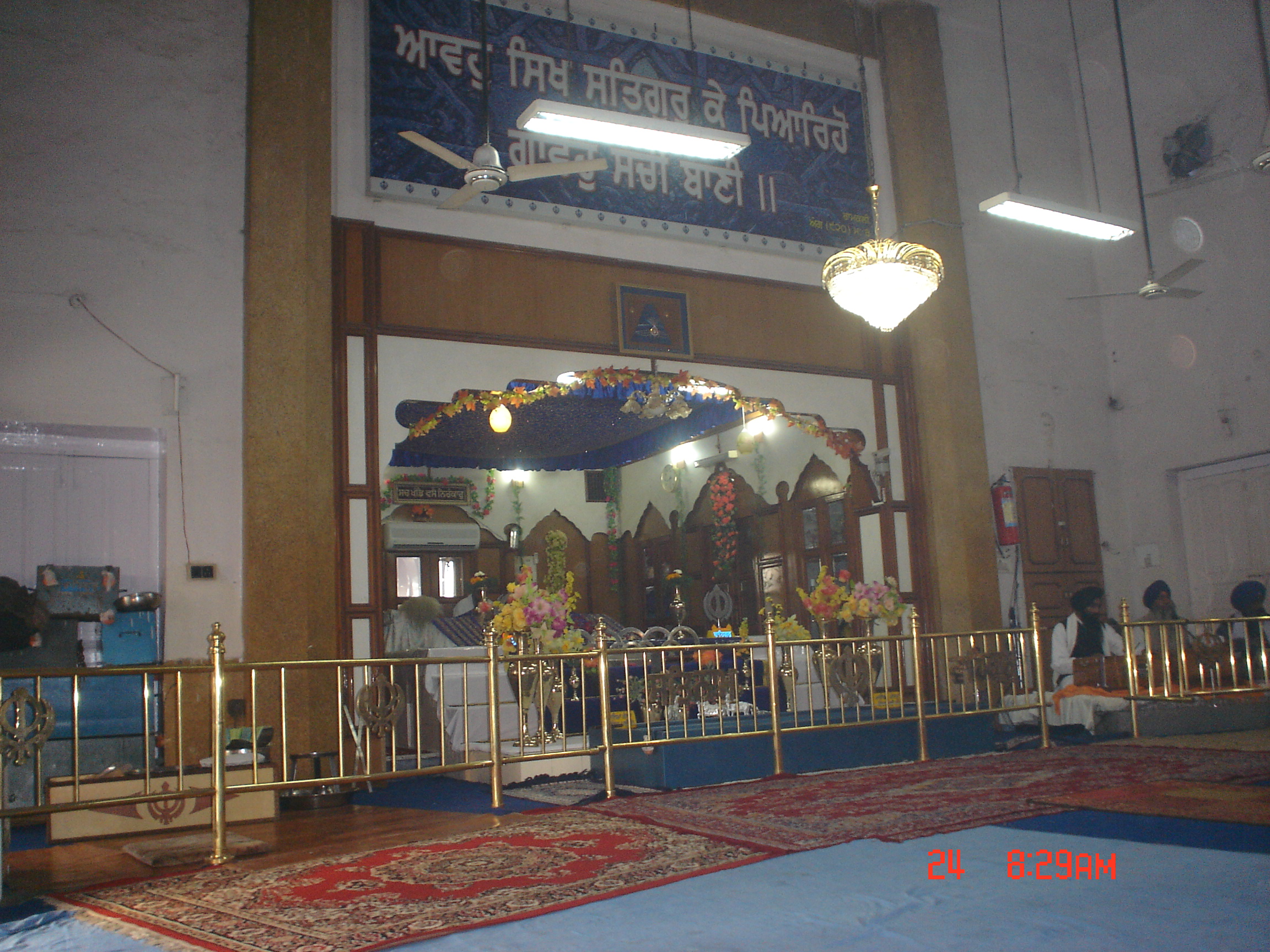
Guru Granth Sahib

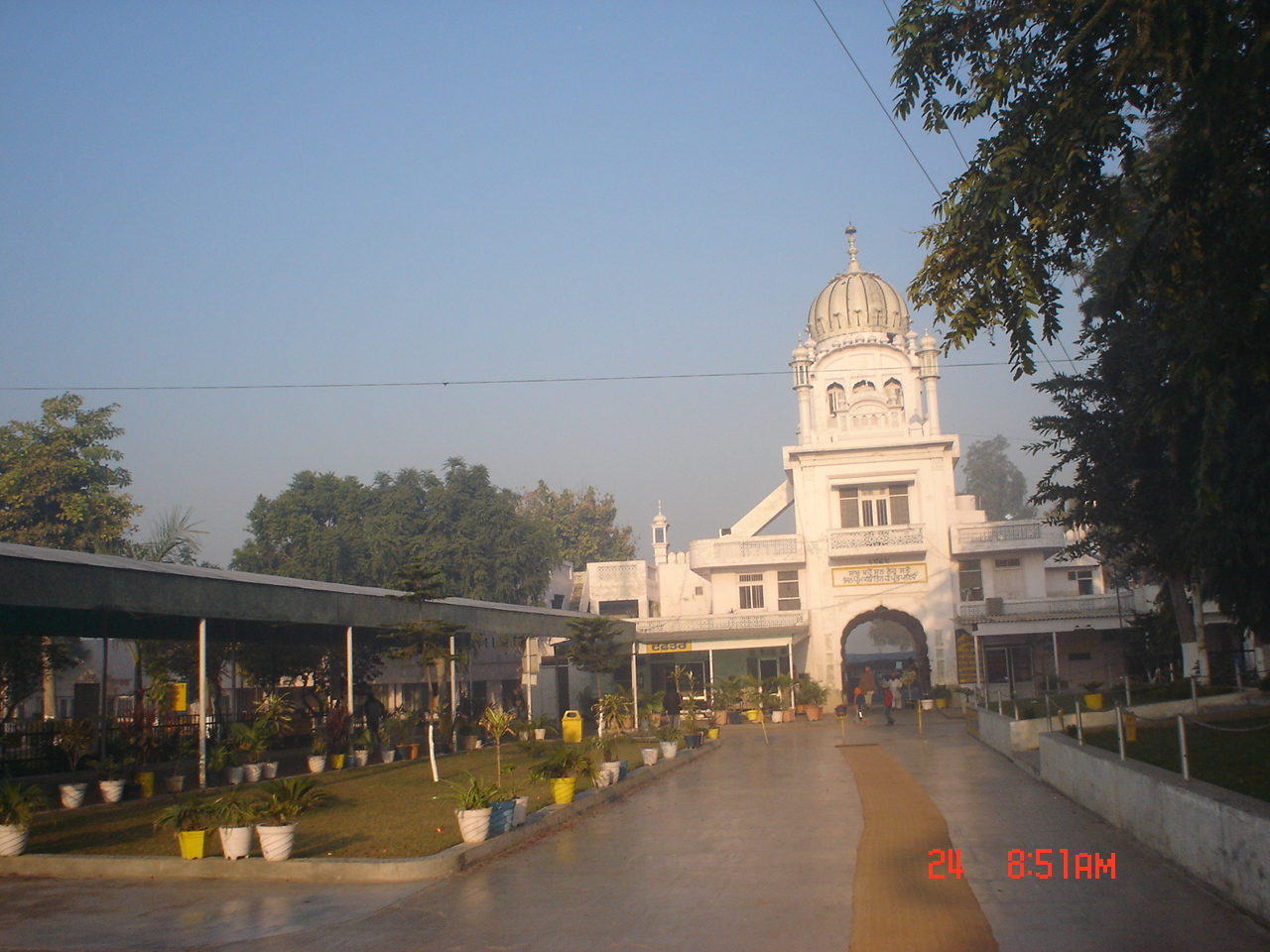
Main gate

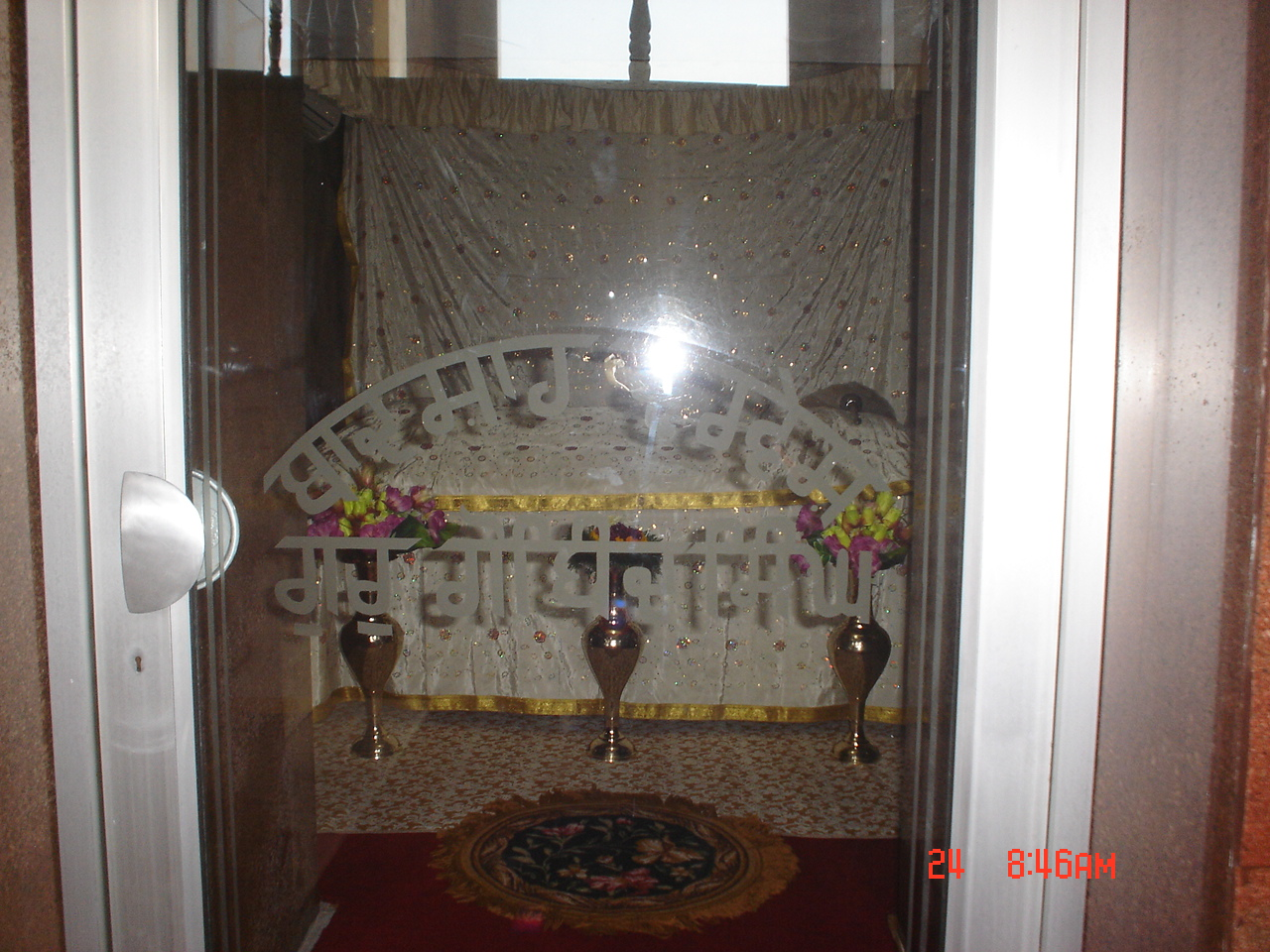
Bhoora Sahib

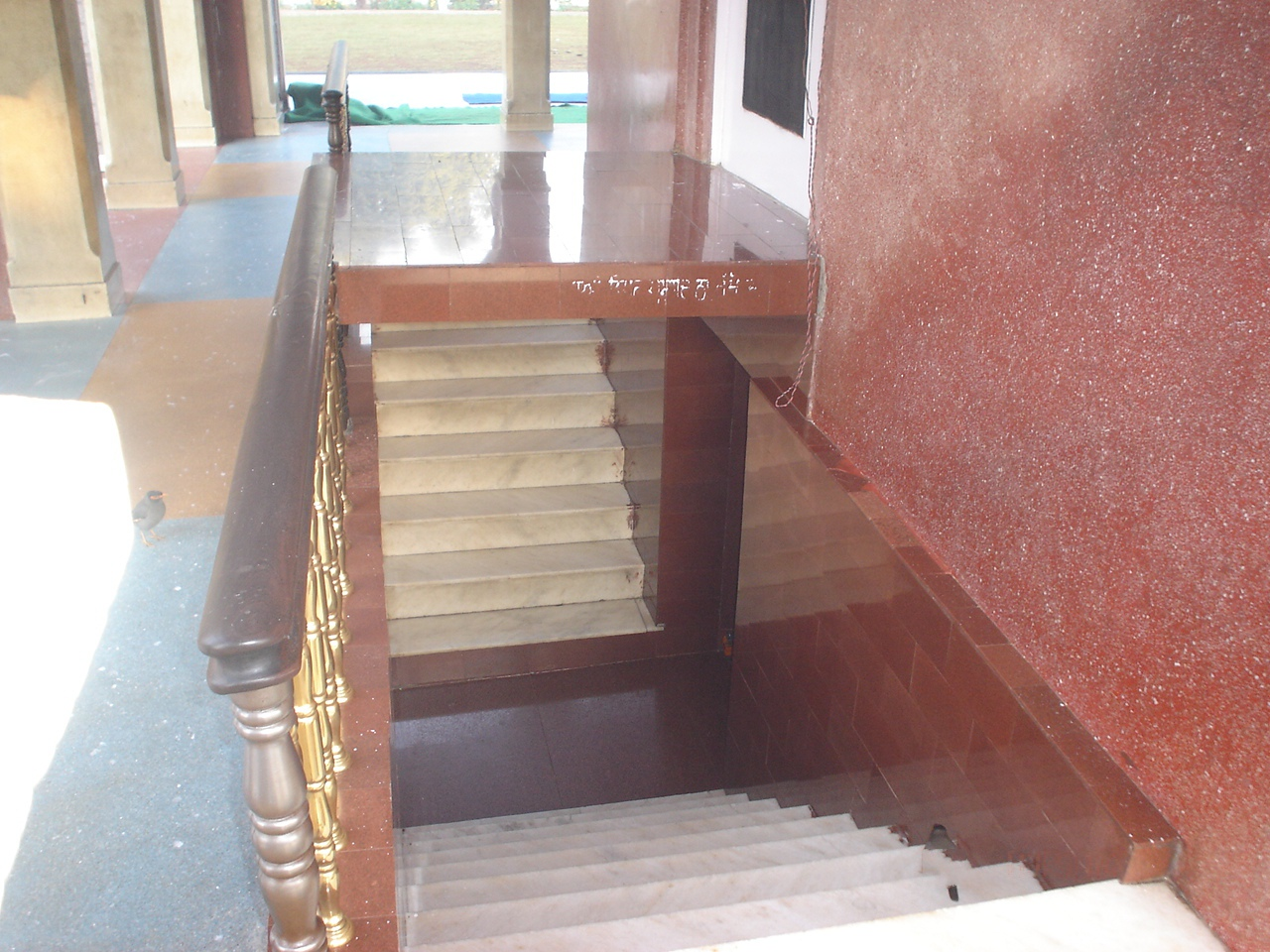
Path to Bhoora Sahib

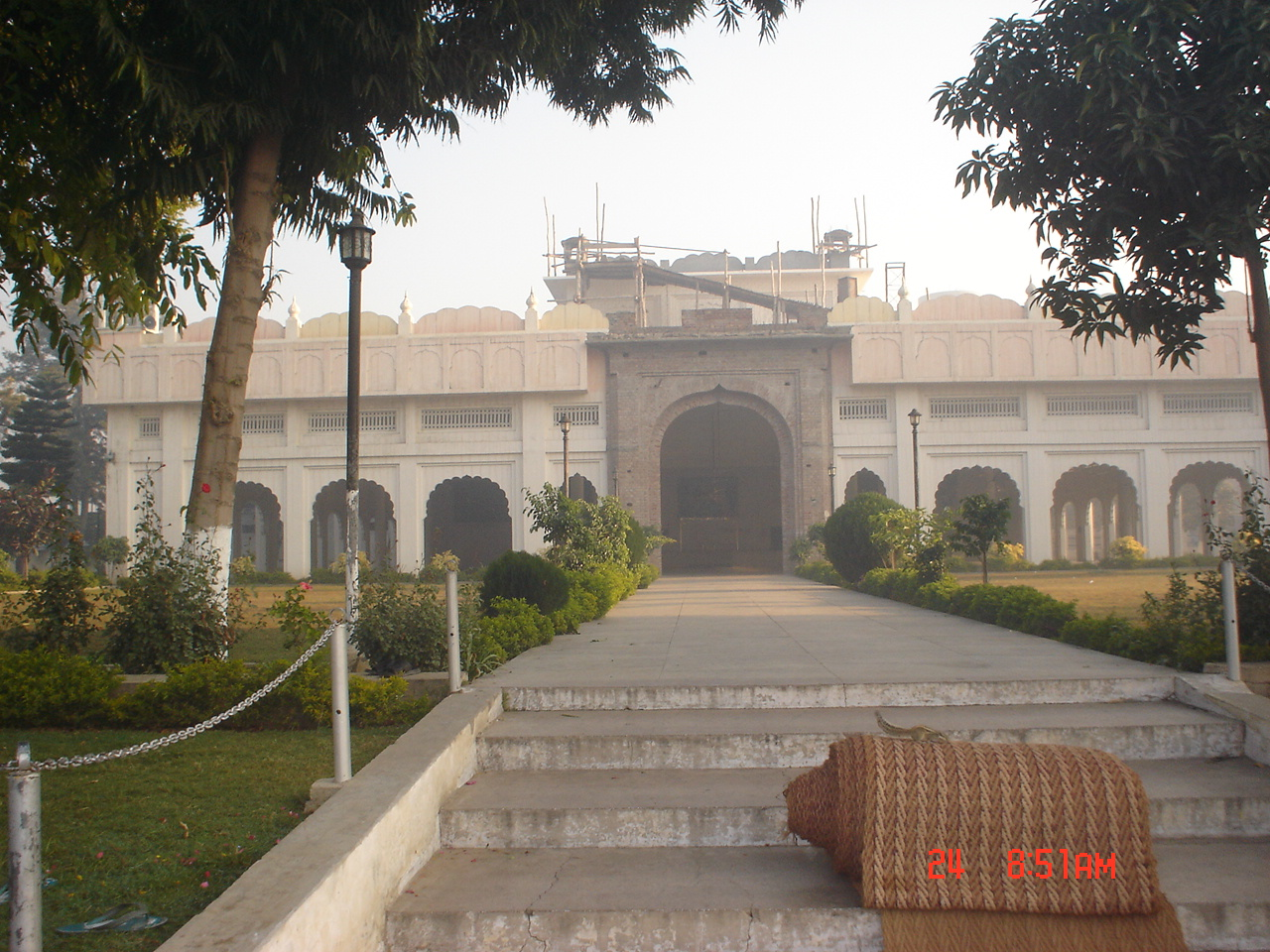
Alamgir Sahib

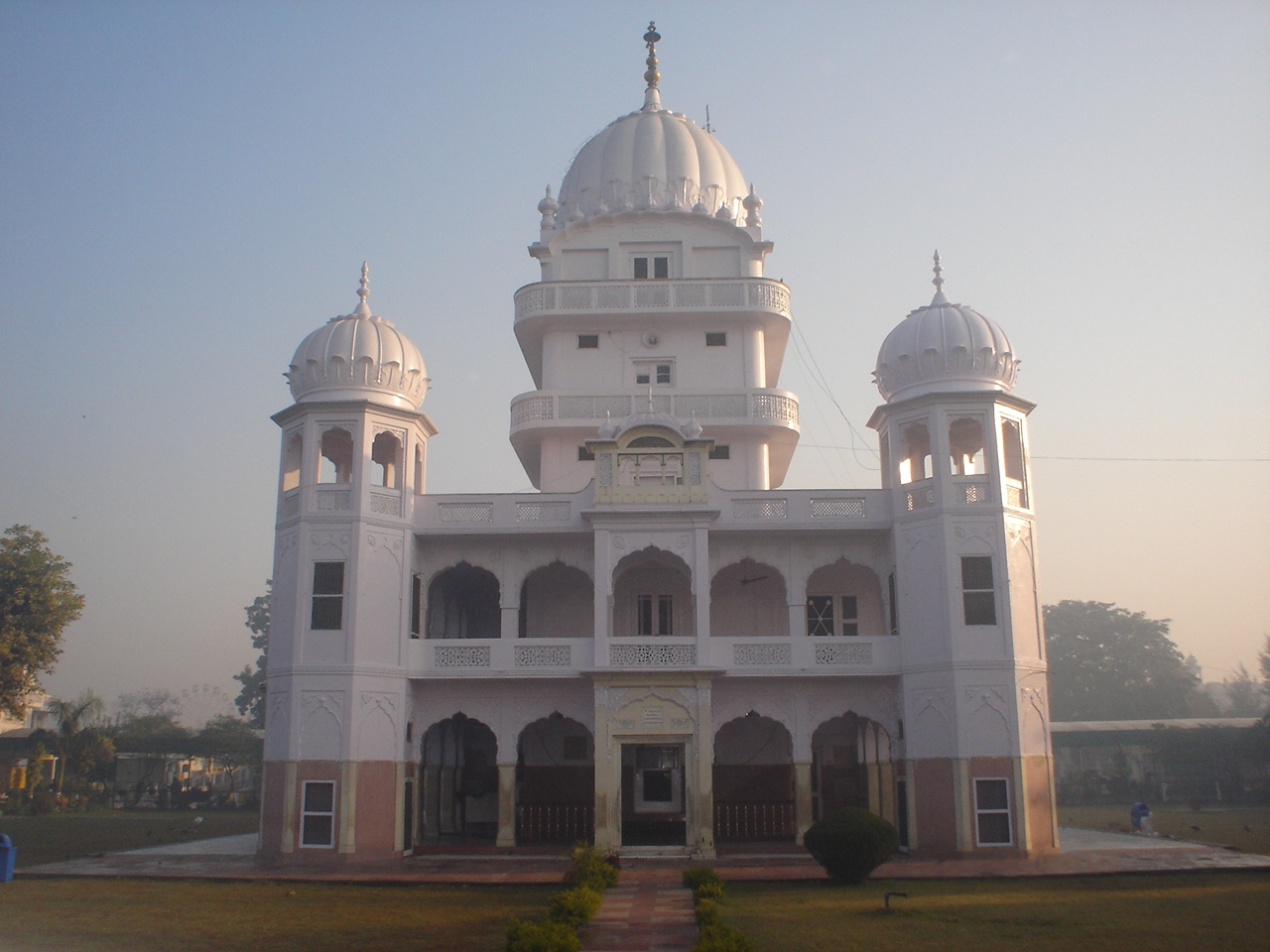
Front view

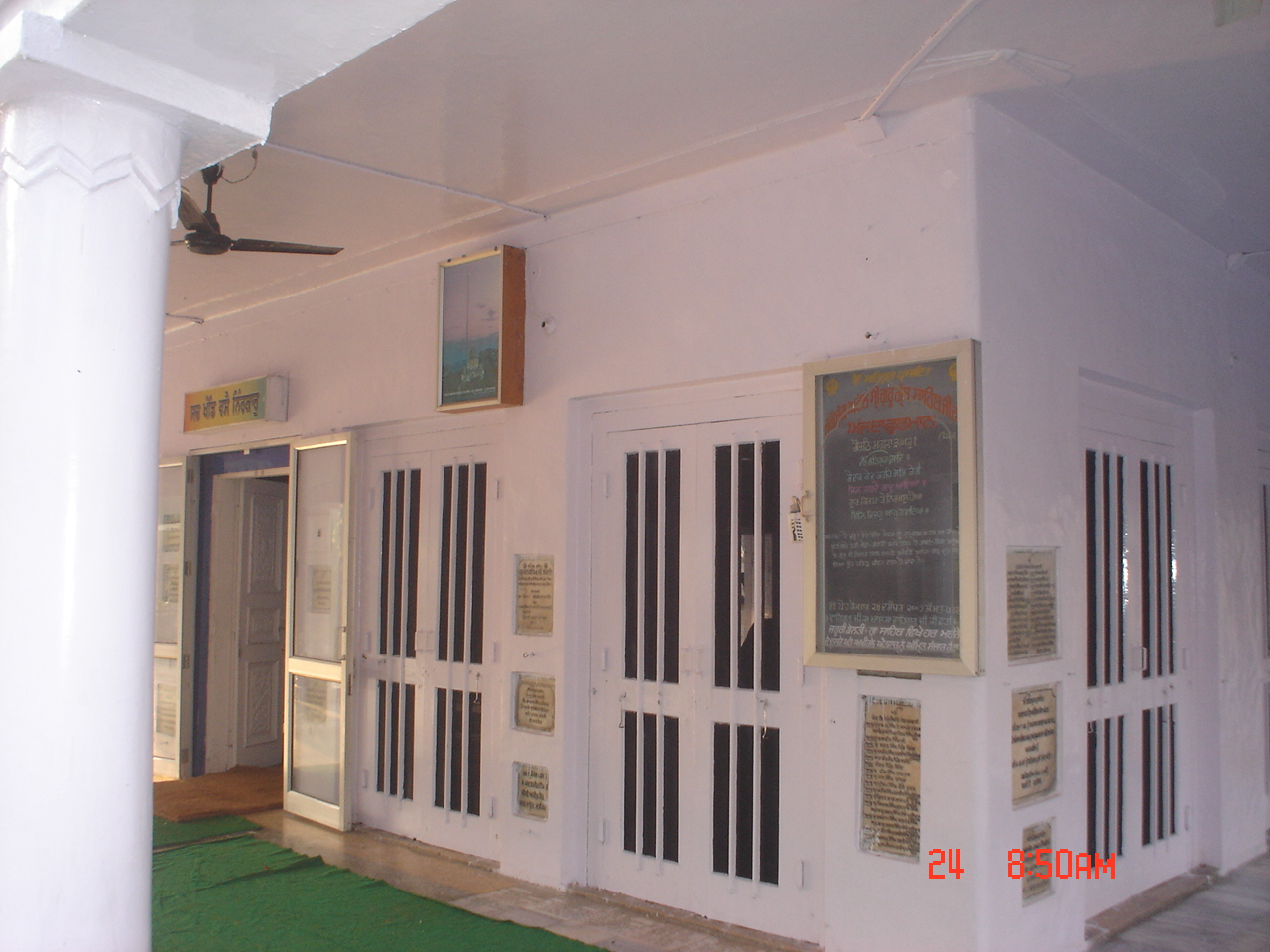
Alamgir Sahib

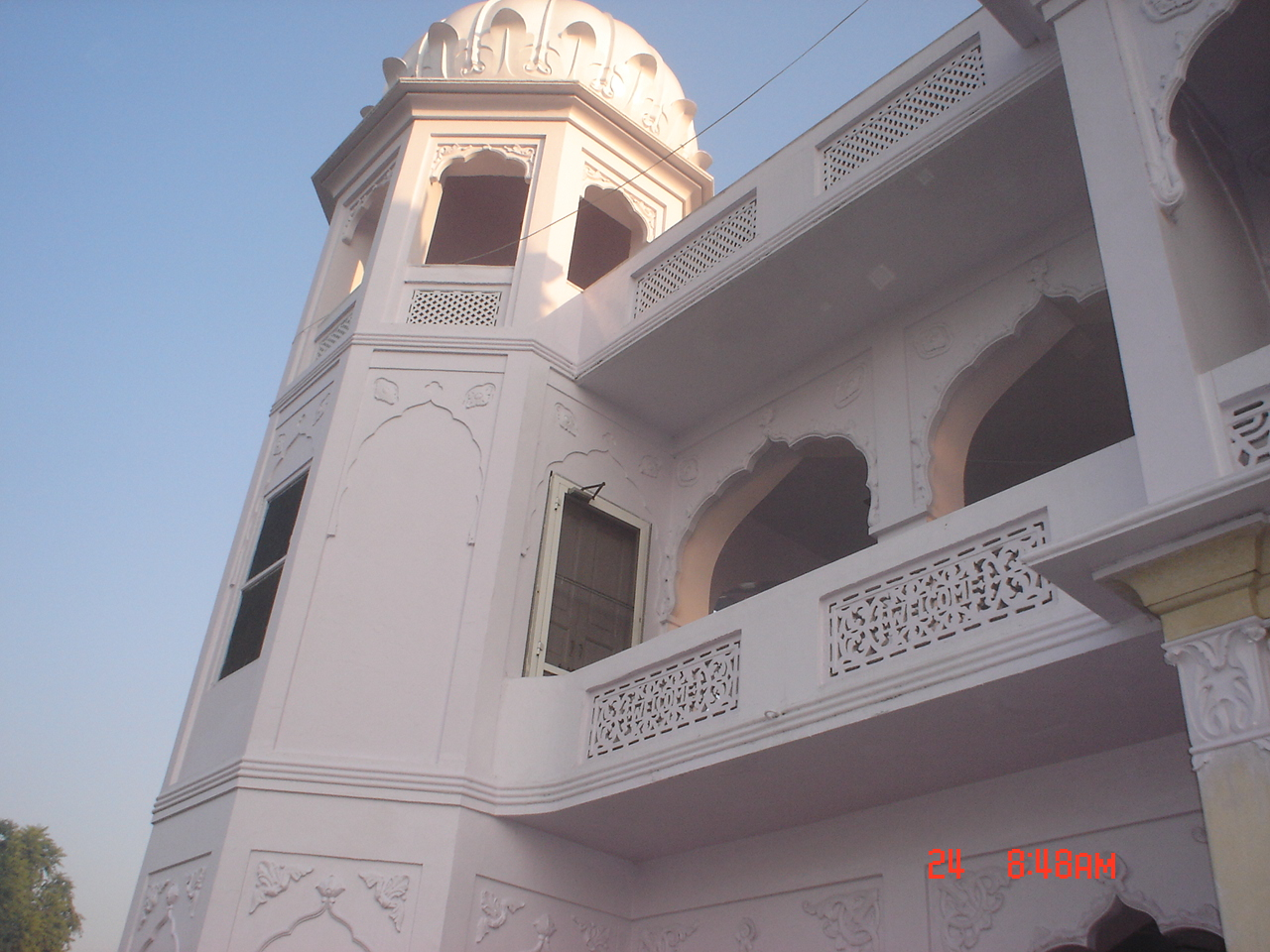
Alamgir Sahib
