= Naqneh =

City in Chaharmahal and Bakhtiari province, Iran

Naqneh Persian: نقنه
- City
- Location within Iran
- Coordinates: 31°55′57″N 51°19′45″E
- Country: Iran
- Province: Chaharmahal and Bakhtiari
- County: Borujen
- District: Central
- Established as a city: 2007

Population (2016)
  - Total: 9,923
- Time zone: UTC+3:30 (IRST)

Naqneh (Persian: نقنه) (Note: Also known as Naghuna and Naqon) is a city in the Central District of Borujen County, Chaharmahal and Bakhtiari province, Iran, serving as the administrative center for Howmeh Rural District.

== Demographics ==
=== Language and ethnicity ===
The city is populated by Persians and Qashqais with a small Luri minority.

The linguistic composition of the city:

Naqneh linguistic composition
Language	percent
New Persian	50%
Qashqai	48%
Bakhtiari Luri	2%

=== Population ===
At the time of the 2006 National Census, Naqneh's population was 8,086 in 1,994 households, when it was a village in Howmeh Rural District. The following census in 2011 counted 9,603 people in 2,649 households, by which time Naqneh had been converted to a city. The 2016 census measured the population of the city as 9,923 people in 2,815 households.
