= Sefiddasht =

City in Chaharmahal and Bakhtiari province, Iran

Sefiddasht Persian: سفيددشت
- City
- Location within Iran
- Coordinates: 32°07′51″N 51°11′01″E
- Country: Iran
- Province: Chaharmahal and Bakhtiari
- County: Borujen
- District: Central
- Established as a city: 1997

Population (2016)
  - Total: 5,471
- Time zone: UTC+3:30 (IRST)

Sefiddasht (Persian: سفيددشت) (Note: Also romanized as Safīd Dasht, Sefīd Dasht, and Sefīddasht) is a city in the Central District of Borujen County, Chaharmahal and Bakhtiari province, Iran. The village of Sefiddasht was converted to a city in 1997.

== Demographics ==
=== Ethnicity ===
The city is populated by Turkic people.

=== Population ===
At the time of the 2006 National Census, the city's population was 5,880 in 1,333 households. The following census in 2011 counted 5,561 people in 1,421 households. The 2016 census measured the population of the city as 5,471 people in 1,542 households.

== Economy ==
The economy of Sefiddasht is based on local agriculture taking place in the Sefiddasht plains and local textile industry. Its main economic concerns are agriculture due to lack of sufficient ground water.

- Saba Foulad Zagros (2009), Iranian steel re-bar manufacturing company.
