= Alamgir (Ludhiana West) =

- Village
- Location in Punjab, India Alamgir (India)
- Coordinates: 30.801875°N 75.85816°E
- Country: India
- State: Punjab
- District: Ludhiana
- Tehsil: Ludhiana West
- Named for: Emperor Aurangzeb

Government
  - Type: Panchayati raj (India)
  - Body: Gram panchayat

Languages
  - Official: Punjabi
  - Other spoken: Hindi
- Time zone: UTC+5:30 (IST)
- Telephone code: 0161
- ISO 3166 code: IN-PB
- Vehicle registration: PB-10
- Website: ludhiana.nic.in

Alamgir is a village located in the Ludhiana West tehsil, of Ludhiana district, Punjab.

== Administration ==
The village is administered by a Sarpanch who is an elected representative of the village as per the constitution of India and Panchayati raj (India).

Particulars	Total	Male	Female
Total No. of Houses	700		
Population	3,498	1,823	1,675
Child (0–6)	344	443	432
Schedule Caste	875	310	287
Schedule Tribe	0	0	0
Literacy	82.94 %	86.03%	79.60 %
Total Workers	1,130	1,028	102
Main Worker	1,096	0	0
Marginal Worker	34	26	08

== Air travel connectivity ==
The closest airport to the village is Sahnewal Airport.
