= Gondaman, West Azerbaijan =

Gondaman گندمان
- Village
- Location within Iran
- Coordinates: 36°15′22″N 45°42′18″E
- Country: Iran
- Province: West Azerbaijan
- County: Bukan
- Bakhsh: Central
- Rural District: Il Gavark

Population (2006)
  - Total: 134
- Time zone: UTC+3:30 (IRST)
  - Summer (DST): UTC+4:30 (IRDT)

Gondaman (Persian: گندمان, also Romanized as Gondamān and Gandomān) is a village in Il Gavark Rural District, in the Central District of Bukan County, West Azerbaijan Province, Iran. At the 2006 census, its population was 134, in 25 families.
