= Kotak, Kohgiluyeh and Boyer-Ahmad =

Kotak كتك
- Village
- Location within Iran
- Coordinates: 31°08′54″N 51°10′48″E
- Country: Iran
- Province: Kohgiluyeh and Boyer-Ahmad
- County: Dana
- Bakhsh: Pataveh
- Rural District: Sadat Mahmudi

Population (2006)
  - Total: 104
- Time zone: UTC+3:30 (IRST)
  - Summer (DST): UTC+4:30 (IRDT)

Kotak (Persian: كتك; also known as Eslāmābād-e Kotak) is a village in Sadat Mahmudi Rural District, Pataveh District, Dana County, Kohgiluyeh and Boyer-Ahmad Province, Iran. At the 2006 census, its population was 104, in 19 families.
