= Kotak (surname) =

Kotak is a surname. Notable persons with that name include:

- İsmet Kotak (1939–2011), Turkish Cypriot politician
- Karishma Kotak (born 1982), Indian model and actor
- Marni Kotak (born 1974), American artist
- Shitanshu Kotak (born 1972), Indian cricketer
- Uday Kotak (born 1959), Indian businessman
- Vaju Kotak (born 1915), Indian writer
