= Howmeh Rural District (Borujen County) =

Rural district in Chaharmahal and Bakhtiari province, Iran

Howmeh Rural District Persian: دهستان حومه
- Rural District
- Location within Iran
- Coordinates: 32°01′25″N 51°14′44″E
- Country: Iran
- Province: Chaharmahal and Bakhtiari
- County: Borujen
- District: Central
- Established: 1987
- Capital: Naqneh

Population (2016)
  - Total: 1,133
- Time zone: UTC+3:30 (IRST)

Howmeh Rural District (Persian: دهستان حومه) is in the Central District of Borujen County, Chaharmahal and Bakhtiari province, Iran. It is administered from the city of Naqneh.

== Demographics ==
=== Population ===
At the time of the 2006 National Census, the rural district's population was 10,230 in 2,505 households. There were 1,228 inhabitants in 345 households at the following census of 2011. The 2016 census measured the population of the rural district as 1,133 in 329 households. The most populous of its three villages was Dehnow, with 978 people.
