= Deh Bagh, Kermanshah =

Deh Bagh ده باغ
- Village
- Location within Iran
- Coordinates: 34°37′27″N 46°56′20″E
- Country: Iran
- Province: Kermanshah
- County: Kermanshah
- Bakhsh: Central
- Rural District: Miyan Darband

Population (2006)
  - Total: 164
- Time zone: UTC+3:30 (IRST)
  - Summer (DST): UTC+4:30 (IRDT)

Deh Bagh (Persian: ده باغ, also Romanized as Deh Bāgh; also known as Deh Bākh) is a village in Miyan Darband Rural District, in the Central District of Kermanshah County, Kermanshah Province, Iran. At the 2006 census, its population was 164, in 36 families.
