= Katak, Lamerd =

Katak كتك
- Village
- Location within Iran
- Coordinates: 27°30′10″N 53°17′02″E
- Country: Iran
- Province: Fars
- County: Lamerd
- Bakhsh: Alamarvdasht
- Rural District: Kheyrgu

Population (2006)
  - Total: 172
- Time zone: UTC+3:30 (IRST)
  - Summer (DST): UTC+4:30 (IRDT)

Katak (Persian: كتك; also known as Kahatak) is a village in Kheyrgu Rural District, Alamarvdasht District, Lamerd County, Fars province, Iran. At the 2006 census, its population was 172, in 35 families.
