= Katak, Arsanjan =

Katak كتك
- Village
- Location within Iran
- Coordinates: 29°44′24″N 53°18′37″E
- Country: Iran
- Province: Fars
- County: Arsanjan
- Bakhsh: Central
- Rural District: Shurab

Population (2006)
  - Total: 671
- Time zone: UTC+3:30 (IRST)
  - Summer (DST): UTC+4:30 (IRDT)

Katak (Persian: كتك) is a village in Shurab Rural District, in the Central District of Arsanjan County, Fars province, Iran. At the 2006 census, its population was 671, in 148 families.
