= Gandoman, Sanandaj =

Gandoman گندمان
- Village
- Location within Iran
- Coordinates: 35°11′11″N 46°56′00″E
- Country: Iran
- Province: Kurdistan
- County: Sanandaj
- Bakhsh: Central
- Rural District: Abidar

Population (2006)
  - Total: 190
- Time zone: UTC+3:30 (IRST)
  - Summer (DST): UTC+4:30 (IRDT)

Gandoman (Persian: گندمان, also Romanized as Gandomān; also known as Gandumban and Kandomān) is a village in Abidar Rural District, in the Central District of Sanandaj County, Kurdistan Province, Iran. At the 2006 census, its population was 190, in 51 families. The village is populated by Kurds.
