= Deh Ali, Sirjan =

Deh Ali ده علي
- Village
- Location within Iran
- Coordinates: 29°45′18″N 56°04′02″E
- Country: Iran
- Province: Kerman
- County: Sirjan
- Bakhsh: Central
- Rural District: Chahar Gonbad

Population (2006)
  - Total: 16
- Time zone: UTC+3:30 (IRST)
  - Summer (DST): UTC+4:30 (IRDT)

Deh Ali (Persian: ده علي, also Romanized as Deh ‘Alī) is a village in Chahar Gonbad Rural District, in the Central District of Sirjan County, Kerman Province, Iran. At the 2006 census, its population was 16, in 4 families.
