= Dehkhoda, Hormozgan =

Dehkhoda دهخدا
- Village
- Location within Iran
- Coordinates: 26°46′34″N 55°49′00″E
- Country: Iran
- Province: Hormozgan
- County: Qeshm
- Bakhsh: Shahab
- Rural District: Salakh

Population (2006)
  - Total: 525
- Time zone: UTC+3:30 (IRST)
  - Summer (DST): UTC+4:30 (IRDT)

Dehkhoda (Persian: دهخدا, also Romanized as Dehkhodā; also known as Khowr Khārān, Khowr Khūrān, Khūr Kharān, and Khvor Kharān) is a village in Salakh Rural District, Shahab District, Qeshm County, Hormozgan Province, Iran. At the 2006 census, its population was 525, in 127 families.
