= Gonak =

Gonak گنک
- village
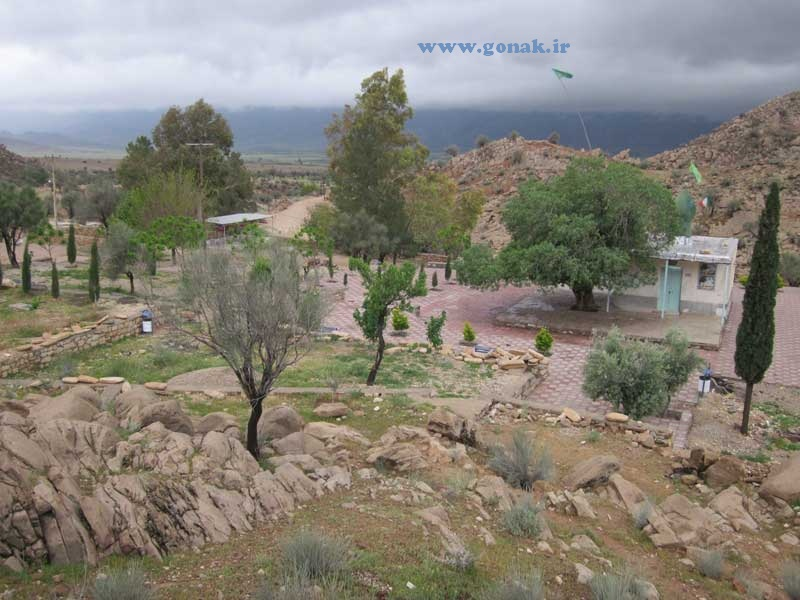
- Shrine Shahataallah in Gonak

- Location within Iran
- Coordinates: 28°52′52″N 52°51′04″E
- Country: Iran
- Province: Fars
- County: Firuzabad
- Bakhsh: Meymand

Government
  - Mayor: Mohammad Jafari

Population (2011)
  - Total: 1,021
- Time zone: UTC+3:30 (IRST)
  - Summer (DST): UTC+4:30 (IRDT)
- Area code: 0715
- Website: http://gonak.ir

Gonak (Persian: گنک;) is a village in Meymand District, Firuzabad County, Fars province, Iran. At the 2011 census, its population was 1021, in 431 families.
