= Deh Bagh, Kuzaran =

Deh Bagh ده باغ
- Village
- Location within Iran
- Coordinates: 34°22′56″N 46°37′58″E
- Country: Iran
- Province: Kermanshah
- County: Kermanshah
- Bakhsh: Kuzaran
- Rural District: Sanjabi

Population (2006)
  - Total: 49
- Time zone: UTC+3:30 (IRST)
  - Summer (DST): UTC+4:30 (IRDT)

Deh Bagh (Persian: ده باغ, also Romanized as Deh Bāgh) is a village in Sanjabi Rural District, Kuzaran District, Kermanshah County, Kermanshah Province, Iran. At the 2006 census, its population was 49, in 10 families.
