= Gerd Bisheh, Khuzestan =

Gerd Bisheh گردبيشه
- Village
- Location within Iran
- Coordinates: 32°29′22″N 48°54′41″E
- Country: Iran
- Province: Khuzestan
- County: Dezful
- Bakhsh: Sardasht
- Rural District: Sardasht

Population (2006)
  - Total: 38
- Time zone: UTC+3:30 (IRST)
  - Summer (DST): UTC+4:30 (IRDT)

Gerd Bisheh (Persian: گردبيشه, also Romanized as Gerd Bīsheh; also known as Gardbīsheh) is a village in Sardasht Rural District, Sardasht District, Dezful County, Khuzestan Province, Iran. At the 2006 census, its population was 38, in 7 families.
