= Gandoman =

City in Chaharmahal and Bakhtiari province, Iran

Gandoman Persian: گندمان
- City
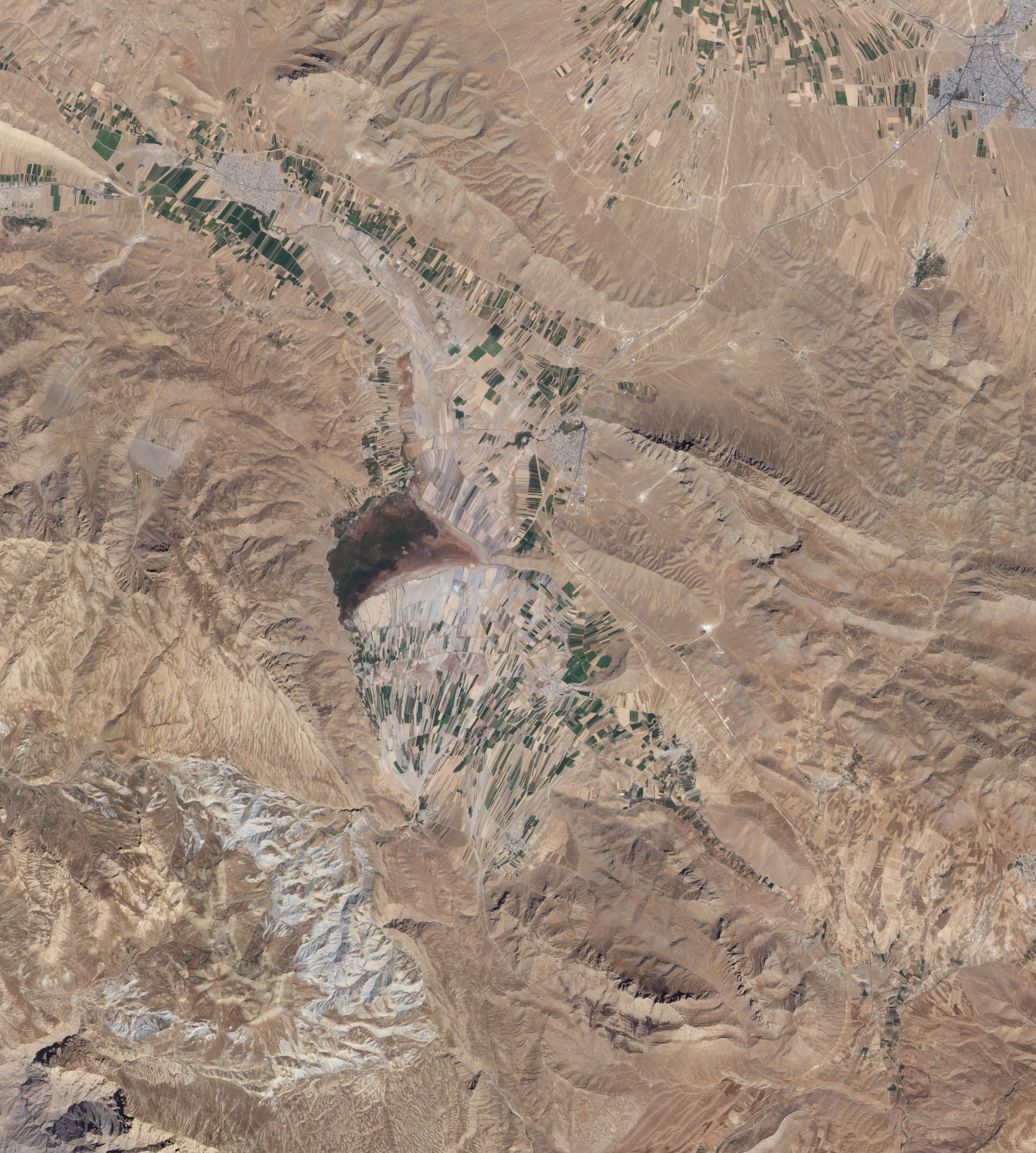
- Gandoman is in the center of this satellite image

- Location within Iran
- Coordinates: 31°51′54″N 51°09′17″E
- Country: Iran
- Province: Chaharmahal and Bakhtiari
- County: Borujen
- District: Gandoman

Population (2016)
  - Total: 6,291
- Time zone: UTC+3:30 (IRST)

Gandoman (Persian: گندمان) (Note: Also romanized as Gandomān; also known as Qal‘eh Ganduman and Qal‘eh-ye Gandomān (قَلعِۀ گَندُمان), translated as Fort Gandoman) is a city in, and the capital of, Gandoman District in Borujen County, Chaharmahal and Bakhtiari province, Iran. It also serves as the administrative center for Gandoman Rural District.

== Demographics ==
=== Ethnicity ===
The city is populated by Persian.

=== Population ===
At the time of the 2006 National Census, the city's population was 5,578 in 1,388 households. The following census in 2011 counted 5,761 people in 1,576 households. The 2016 census measured the population of the city as 6,291 people in 1,852 households.

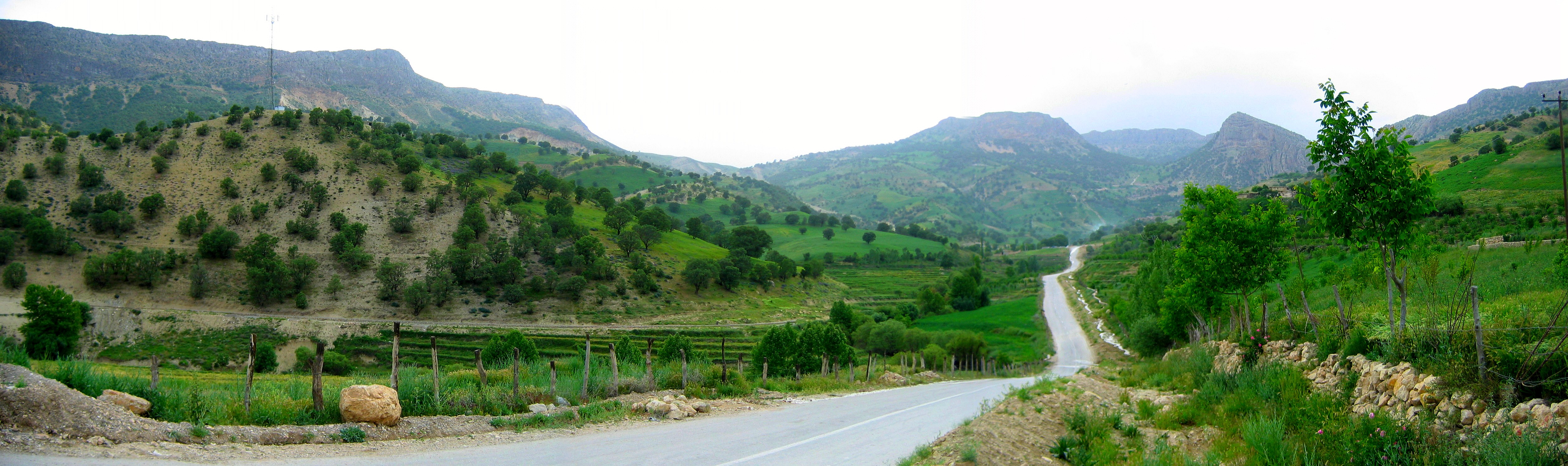
View of the road leading to the Ghandoman Wetlands
