= Deh-e Bagh, Lordegan =

Deh-e Bagh ده باغ
- Village
- Location within Iran
- Coordinates: 31°25′44″N 50°47′49″E
- Country: Iran
- Province: Chaharmahal and Bakhtiari
- County: Lordegan
- Bakhsh: Central
- Rural District: Sardasht

Population (2006)
  - Total: 53
- Time zone: UTC+3:30 (IRST)
  - Summer (DST): UTC+4:30 (IRDT)

Deh-e Bagh (Persian: ده باغ, also Romanized as Deh-e Bāgh) is a village in Sardasht Rural District, in the Central District of Lordegan County, Chaharmahal and Bakhtiari Province, Iran. At the 2006 census, its population was 53, in 11 families.
