= Biahi =

Biahi بياهي
- Village
- Location within Iran
- Coordinates: 25°28′07″N 58°59′30″E
- Country: Iran
- Province: Hormozgan
- County: Jask
- Bakhsh: Lirdaf
- Rural District: Piveshk

Population (2006)
  - Total: 536
- Time zone: UTC+3:30 (IRST)
  - Summer (DST): UTC+4:30 (IRDT)

Biahi (Persian: بياهي, also Romanized as Bīāhī, Bayahi, and Beyāhī; also known as Konārak-e Beyāhī) is a village in Piveshk Rural District, Lirdaf District, Jask County, Hormozgan Province, Iran. At the 2006 census, its population was 536, in 135 families.
