= Deh Bagh, Ravansar =

Deh Bagh ده باغ
- Village
- Location within Iran
- Coordinates: 34°22′56″N 46°37′58″E
- Country: Iran
- Province: Kermanshah
- County: Ravansar
- Bakhsh: Central
- Rural District: Hasanabad

Population (2006)
  - Total: 23
- Time zone: UTC+3:30 (IRST)
  - Summer (DST): UTC+4:30 (IRDT)

Deh Bagh (Persian: ده باغ, also Romanized as Deh Bāgh) is a village in Hasanabad Rural District, in the Central District of Ravansar County, Kermanshah Province, Iran. At the 2006 census, its population was 23, in 5 families.
