= Sar Pir, Ardal =

SarPir سرپير
- Village
- Location within Iran
- Coordinates: 32°10′48″N 50°26′34″E
- Country: Iran
- Province: Chaharmahal and Bakhtiari
- County: Ardal
- Bakhsh: Central
- Rural District: Poshtkuh

Population (2006)
  - Total: 137
- Time zone: UTC+3:30 (IRST)
  - Summer (DST): UTC+4:30 (IRDT)

SarPir (Persian: سرپير, also Romanized as SarPīr and Sar-ī-Pīr) is a village in Poshtkuh Rural District, in the Central District of Ardal County, Chaharmahal and Bakhtiari Province, Iran. At the 2006 census, its population was 137, in 40 families.
