= Qaleh-ye Kontak =

Qaleh-ye Kontak قلعه كنتك
- Village
- Location within Iran
- Coordinates: 28°07′10″N 57°52′16″E
- Country: Iran
- Province: Kerman
- County: Rudbar-e Jonubi
- Bakhsh: Central
- Rural District: Rudbar

Population (2006)
  - Total: 67
- Time zone: UTC+3:30 (IRST)
  - Summer (DST): UTC+4:30 (IRDT)

Qaleh-ye Kontak (Persian: قلعه كنتك, also Romanized as Qal‘eh-ye Kontak; also known as Qal‘eh-ye Kotak) is a village in Rudbar Rural District, in the Central District of Rudbar-e Jonubi County, Kerman Province, Iran. At the 2006 census, its population was 67, in 16 families.
