= Tourism in Punjab, India =

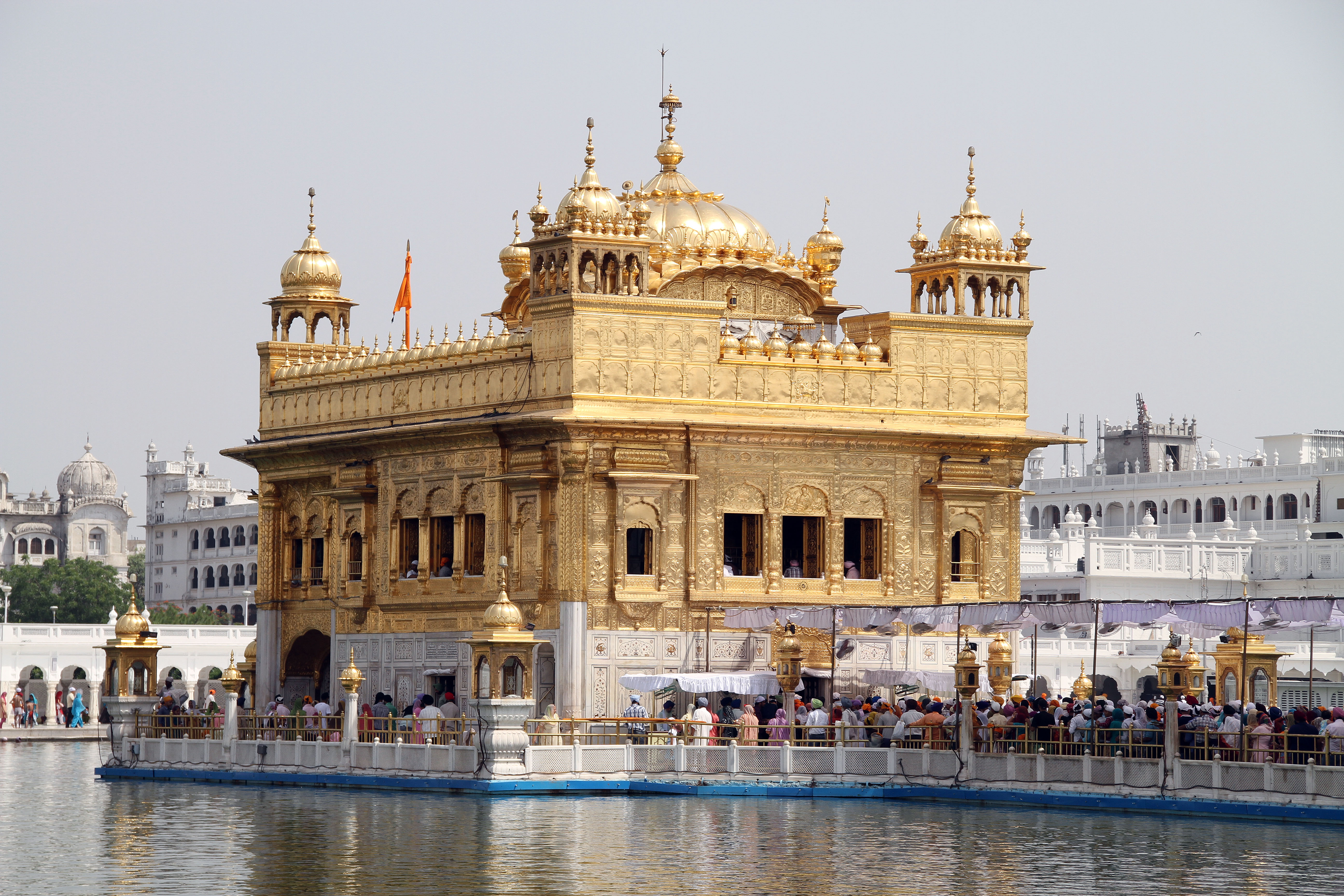
The Harmandir Sahib in Amritsar is the holiest site in Sikhism, and one of the most visited tourist attractions in India.

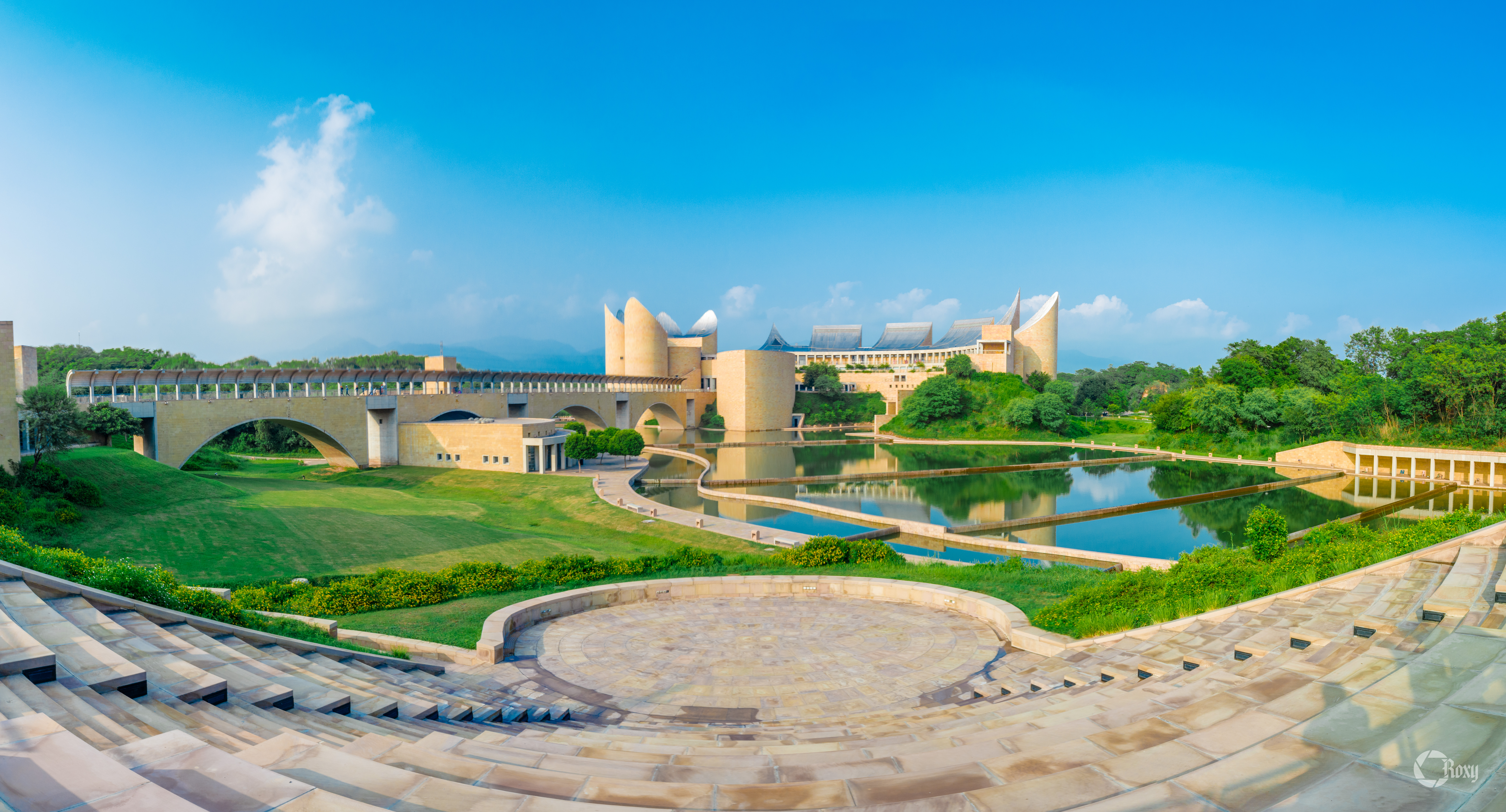
Virasat-e-Khalsa in Anandpur Sahib

The state of Punjab is renowned for its cuisine, culture and history. Punjab has a vast public transportation and communication network.

Punjab receives many religious tourists, as the state is home to some of the holiest places in Sikhism, including the Harmandir Sahib and three of the five Panj Takht.

== Gobindgarh Fort ==
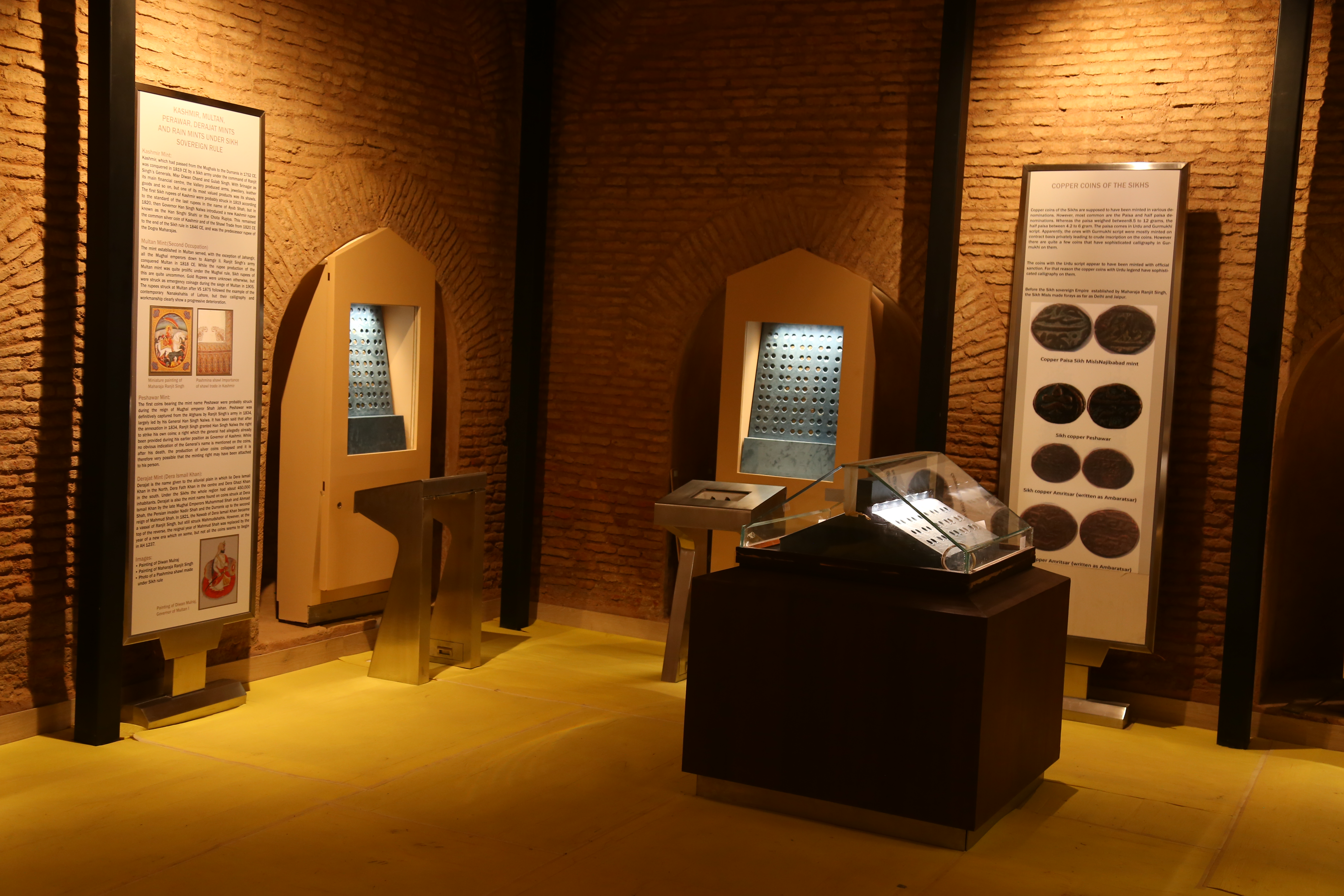
Gobindgarh Fort museum

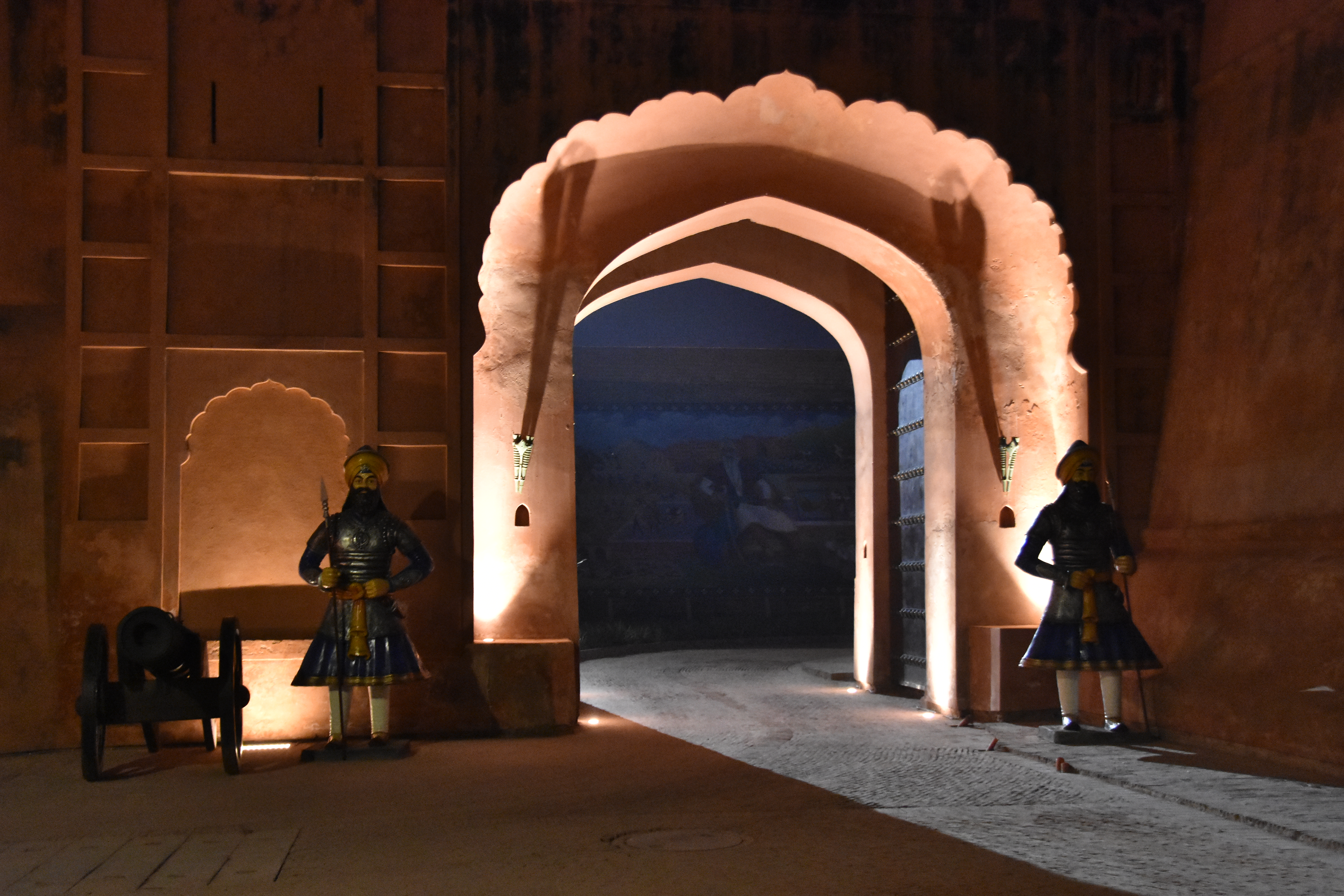
fort entrance

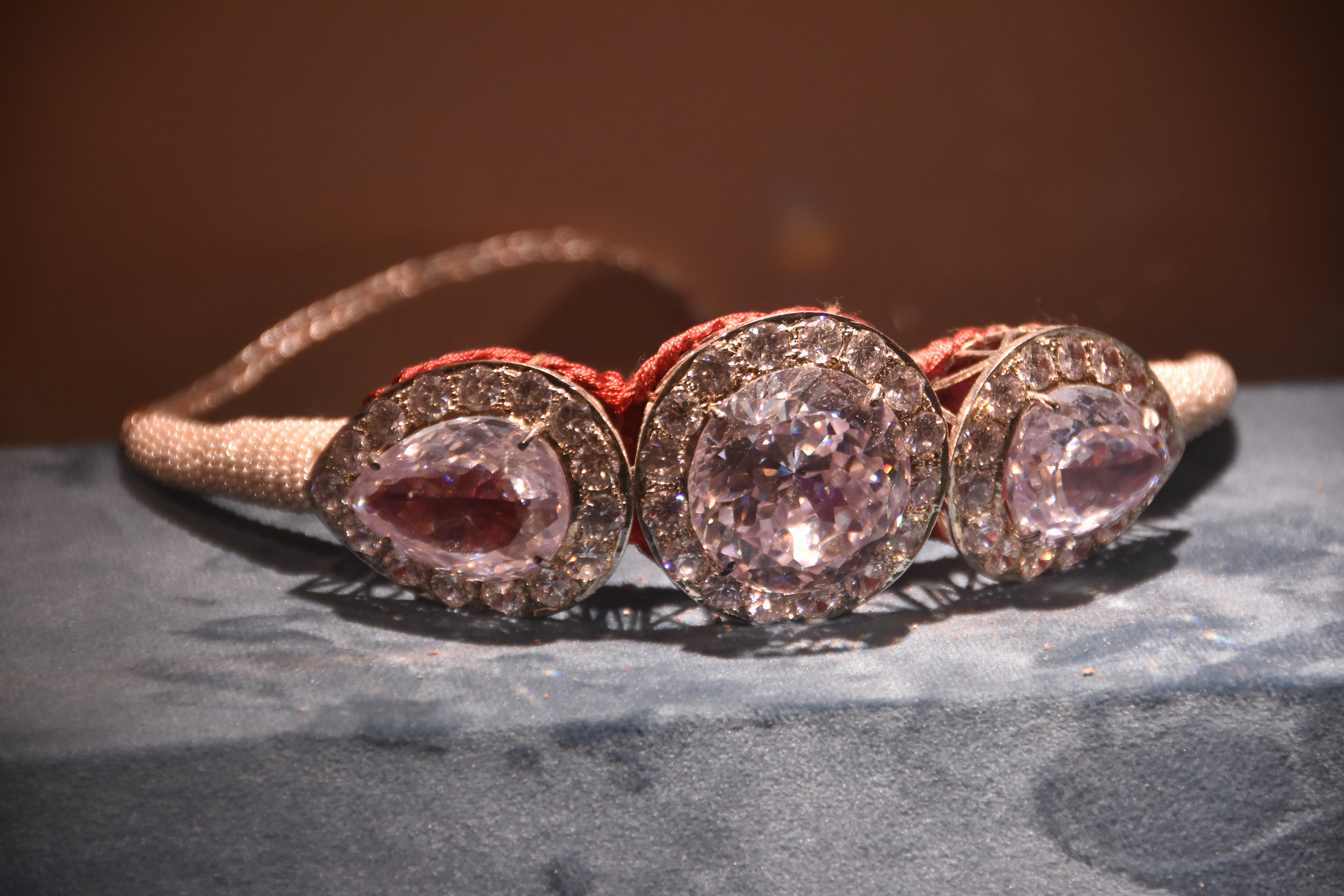
Koh-i-Noor at fort

Gobindgarh Fort of Maharaja Ranjit Singh at Amritsar is developed as a museum and theme park, as a repository of History of Punjab. It has showcase of Zamzama cannon and Koh-i-Noor diamond replica alongside programs of Whispering Walls Laser show, 7D show and night cultural shows.

== Khatkar Kalan ==
Khatkar Kalan is a village between Banga and Nawanshar towns in Shahid Bhagat Singh Nagar district in the Indian state of Punjab. This is the ancestral place of S.Bhagat Singh, the a well known freedom fighter of India. The district is named after his name, Shaheed Bhagat Singh Nagar.

Neighboring villages sharing a boundary with Katkar Kalan are Thandian, Dosanjh Khurd, Manguwal, Karnana, Kahma, Bhootan, Bhukhari and the town of Banga.

== Durgiana Temple ==
The Durgiana Temple, Durga Tirath and Sitla Mandir, is a main Hindu temple of Punjab (India) situated in the city of Amritsar. Though a Hindu temple, its architecture is similar to the Golden Temple of Sikh religion. It is named after name of the Goddess Durga, the chief Goddess deified and worshipped here.

== Harike wetland ==
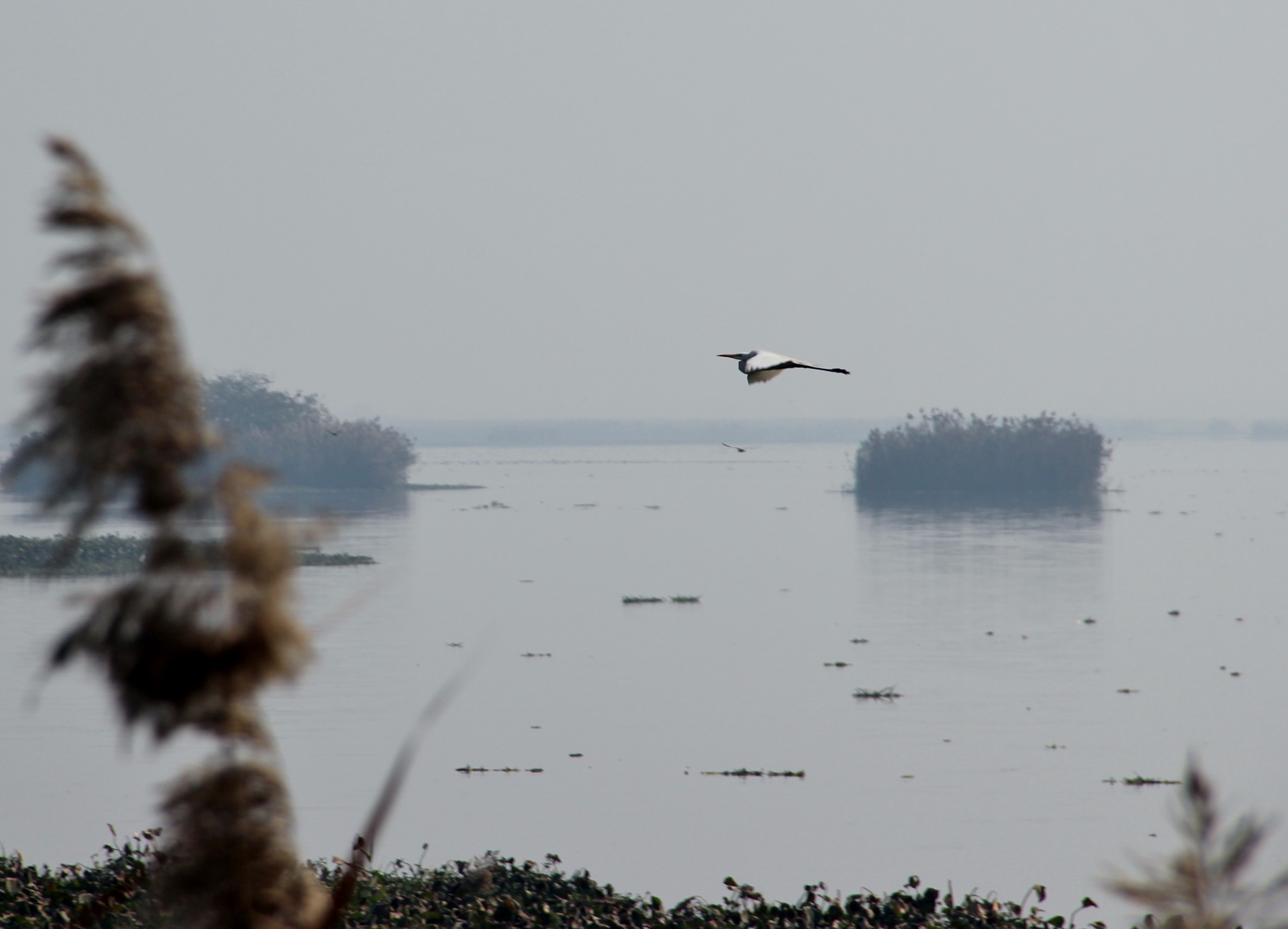
Bird at Harike Wetlands

Harike bird sanctuary also known as Hari-ke-Pattan is wetland where lakhs of birds arrive from Siberia, Russia, Kazakhstan and other low temperature regions start arriving at the from mid-October up to December and stay here till March.

== Jallianwala Bagh ==
Jallianwala Bagh is a garden situated In City Amritsar of Punjab. This monument signifies the nation. It was established in 1951. Jallianwala bagh is well known due to the massacre happened in this monument. Jallianwala Bagh Massacre occurred on 13 April 1919, in which thousands of Indians died as General Dyer ordered their army to fire on the innocent Indians.

== See also ==
- Tourism in Amritsar
- List of fairs and festivals in Punjab, India
