= Central District (Borujen County) =

District in Chaharmahal and Bakhtiari province, Iran

Central District (Borujen County) Persian: بخش مرکزی شهرستان بروجن
- District
- Location within Iran
- Coordinates: 32°01′N 51°15′E
- Country: Iran
- Province: Chaharmahal and Bakhtiari
- County: Borujen
- Capital: Borujen

Population (2016)
  - Total: 86,915
- Time zone: UTC+3:30 (IRST)

The Central District of Borujen County (Persian: بخش مرکزی شهرستان بروجن) is in Chaharmahal and Bakhtiari province, Iran. Its capital is the city of Borujen.

== History ==
The village of Naqneh was converted to a city in 2007.

== Demographics ==
=== Population ===
At the time of the 2006 National Census, the district's population was 77,884 in 19,489 households. The following census in 2011 counted 82,225 people in 22,708 households. The 2016 census measured the population of the district as 86,915 inhabitants living in 25,722 households.

=== Administrative divisions ===
Central District (Borujen County) Population
Administrative Divisions	2006	2011	2016
Howmeh RD	10,230	1,228	1,133
Borujen (city)	49,077	52,694	57,071
Faradonbeh (city)	12,697	13,139	13,317
Naqneh (city)		9,603	9,923
Sefiddasht (city)	5,880	5,561	5,471
Total	77,884	82,225	86,915
RD = Rural District
