= Doraha, Ludhiana =

Doraha
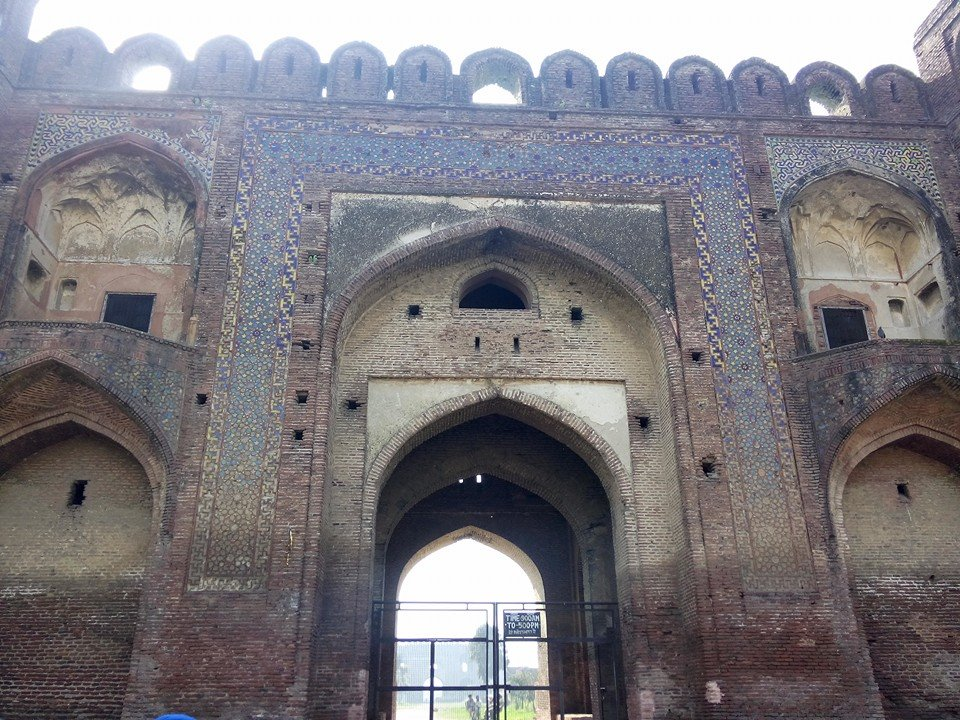

- Location in Punjab, India
- Coordinates: 30°49′N 76°01′E
- Country: India
- State: Punjab
- District: Ludhiana

Population (As per census 2016)
  - Total: 40,000

Languages
  - Official: Punjabi
- Time zone: UTC+5:30 (IST)
- PIN: 141421
- Vehicle registration: 55

Doraha is a city and a municipal council in Ludhiana district in the state of Punjab, India.

== Demographics ==
As of 2015-2016 India census, Doraha had a population of 39999. Males constitute 56% of the population and females 44%. Doraha has an average literacy rate of 71%, higher than the national average of 59.5%: male literacy is 74% and, female literacy is 66%. In Doraha, 12% of the population is under 6 years of age.

== Political, historical and background ==
Doraha is a small town of Punjab in district Ludhiana. The 6th Sikh Guru Sh. Hargobind Ji had visited this area. There are four historical Gurudwaras in Doraha known as: Gurudwara Damdama Sahib, Ber Sahib, Sarai Sahib, and Bauli Sahib.

Amongst the early settlers of Doraha were Er. Gurbaksh Singh Katani, one of the founder members of Guru Nanak Dev Engineering College, Ludhiana. Other prominent people from this town are Kidar nath Sharma of Picadily group of companies, his son Venod Sharma is a politician. This area has given two Chief Ministers. First was Gian Singh Rarewala and the other was Beant Singh Ji Kotli.

Doraha is part of the Payal Assembly Constituency.

== Education ==
Doraha city is the educational hub of the nearby villages and has many institutions which offer education from primary to graduate degree courses. Khalsa Girls School was one of the first Girls School in this area, this was run under the leadership of Er.Gurbaksh Singh Katani. The schools include Dashmesh Model Senior Secondary School, Guru Nanak Model Senior Secondary School, Mehta Gurukul Public School, Doraha Public School, Mount Litera, Saraswati Model Senior Secondary School, Aryaputri Pathshala, Kidzee and many more. Doraha College of Education (DCE) and Guru Nanak National College. Guru Nanak National College is the first institute of higher education in Doraha. It was founded by Dr. Ishwar Singh in 1974. Before this college, the boys and girls of the town and nearby villages went to Khanna and Ludhiana for higher education.

== Business ==
The majority of population in Doraha is self-employed.

The first highway outlet of McDonald's opened its operation on 25 March 2002.
