= Gandoman Rural District =

Rural district in Chaharmahal and Bakhtiari province, Iran

Gandoman Rural District Persian: دهستان گندمان
- Rural District
- Location within Iran
- Coordinates: 31°48′N 51°09′E
- Country: Iran
- Province: Chaharmahal and Bakhtiari
- County: Borujen
- District: Gandoman
- Established: 1987
- Capital: Gandoman

Population (2016)
  - Total: 4,622
- Time zone: UTC+3:30 (IRST)

Gandoman Rural District (Persian: دهستان گندمان) is in Gandoman District of Borujen County, Chaharmahal and Bakhtiari province, Iran. It is administered from the city of Gandoman.

== Demographics ==
=== Population ===
At the time of the 2006 National Census, the rural district's population was 5,128 in 1,238 households. There were 4,855 inhabitants in 1,359 households at the following census of 2011. The 2016 census measured the population of the rural district as 4,622 in 1,393 households. The most populous of its 13 villages was Konarak-e Bala, with 1,058 people.

=== Other villages in the rural district ===
- Bizh Gerd
- Mamureh
- Murchegan
- Vastegan
