= Dowrahan Rural District =

Rural district in Chaharmahal and Bakhtiari province, Iran

Dowrahan Rural District Persian: دهستان درواهان
- Rural District
- Location within Iran
- Coordinates: 31°40′N 51°12′E
- Country: Iran
- Province: Chaharmahal and Bakhtiari
- County: Borujen
- District: Gandoman
- Established: 2001
- Capital: Kord-e Shami

Population (2016)
  - Total: 4,890
- Time zone: UTC+3:30 (IRST)

Dowrahan Rural District (Persian: دهستان درواهان) is in Gandoman District of Borujen County, Chaharmahal and Bakhtiari province, Iran. Its capital is the village of Kord-e Shami.

== Demographics ==
=== Population ===
At the time of the 2006 National Census, the rural district's population was 5,497 in 1,338 households. There were 5,152 inhabitants in 1,433 households at the following census of 2011. The 2016 census measured the population of the rural district as 4,890 in 1,449 households. The most populous of its 15 villages was Emam Qeys, with 2,758 people.

=== Other villages in the rural district ===
- Dowrahan
- Sulgan
