= Gandoman District =

District in Chaharmahal and Bakhtiari province, Iran

Gandoman District Persian: بخش گندمان
- District
- Location within Iran
- Coordinates: 31°42′N 51°11′E
- Country: Iran
- Province: Chaharmahal and Bakhtiari
- County: Borujen
- Capital: Gandoman

Population (2016)
  - Total: 15,803
- Time zone: UTC+3:30 (IRST)

Gandoman District (Persian: بخش گندمان) is in Borujen County, Chaharmahal and Bakhtiari province, Iran. Its capital is the city of Gandoman.

== Demographics ==
=== Population ===
At the time of the 2006 National Census, the district's population was 16,203 in 3,964 households The following census in 2011 counted 15,768 people in 4,368 households. The 2016 census measured the population of the district as 15,803 inhabitants living in 4,694 households.

=== Administrative divisions ===
Gandoman District Population
Administrative Divisions	2006	2011	2016
Dowrahan RD	5,497	5,152	4,890
Gandoman RD	5,128	4,855	4,622
Gandoman (city)	5,578	5,761	6,291
Total	16,203	15,768	15,803
RD = Rural District
