= Borujen County =

County in Chaharmahal and Bakhtiari province, Iran

Borujen County Persian: شهرستان بروجن
- County
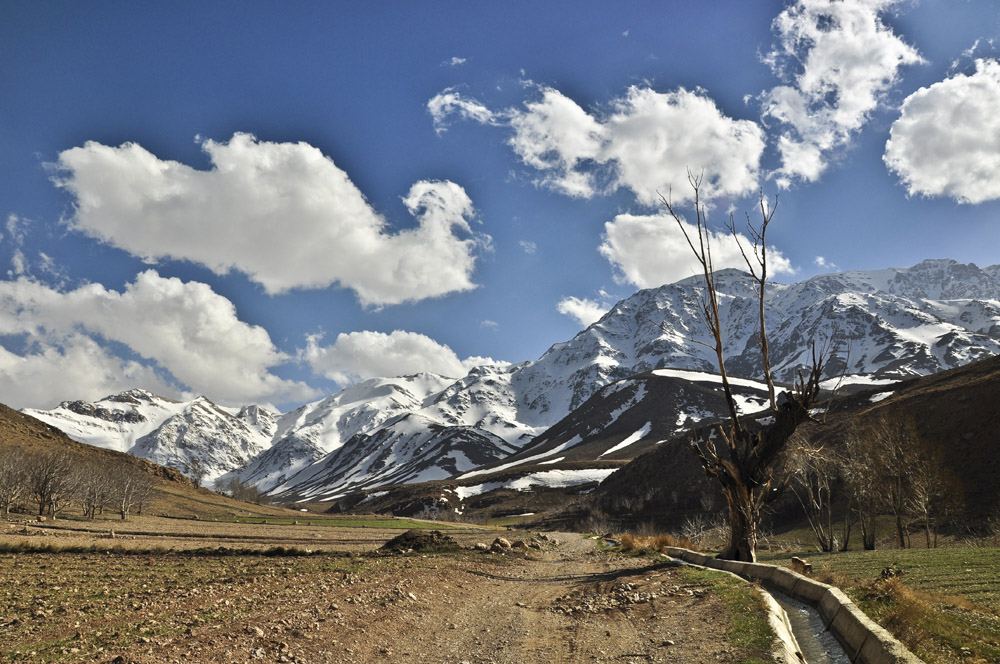
- Chaghakhor Mountains in Borujen County

- Location of Borujen County in Chaharmahal and Bakhtiari province (right, green)

- Location of Chaharmahal and Bakhtiari province in Iran
- Coordinates: 31°55′N 51°06′E
- Country: Iran
- Province: Chaharmahal and Bakhtiari
- Capital: Borujen
- Districts: Central, Boldaji, Gandoman

Population (2016)
  - Total: 122,483
- Time zone: UTC+3:30 (IRST)

Borujen County (Persian: شهرستان بروجن) is in Chaharmahal and Bakhtiari province, Iran. Its capital is the city of Borujen.

== History ==
The village of Naqneh was converted to a city in 2007.

== Demographics ==
=== Population ===
At the time of the 2006 National Census, the county's population was 113,795, in 27,963 households. The following census in 2011 counted 118,681 people in 32,649 households. The 2016 census measured the population of the county as 122,483, in 36,238 households.

=== Administrative divisions ===
Borujen County's population history and administrative structure over three consecutive censuses are shown in the following table.

Borujen County Population
Administrative Divisions	2006	2011	2016
Central District	77,884	82,225	86,915
Howmeh RD	10,230	1,228	1,133
Borujen (city)	49,077	52,694	57,071
Faradonbeh (city)	12,697	13,139	13,317
Naqneh (city)		9,603	9,923
Sefiddasht (city)	5,880	5,561	5,471
Boldaji District	19,708	20,688	19,765
Chaghakhor RD	8,119	6,139	5,216
Emamzadeh Hamzeh Ali RD	684	2,821	2,569
Boldaji (city)	10,905	11,728	11,980
Gandoman District	16,203	15,768	15,803
Dowrahan RD	5,497	5,152	4,890
Gandoman RD	5,128	4,855	4,622
Gandoman (city)	5,578	5,761	6,291
Total	113,795	118,681	122,483
RD = Rural District

== See also ==
Media related to Borujen County at Wikimedia Commons
