= Darreh Shur =

Darreh Shur or Darrehshur or Darreh-ye Shur or Darrah Shur or Dareh Shoor (Persian: دره شور) may refer to:

- Darreh Shur, Ardal, Chaharmahal and Bakhtiari province
- Darreh Shur, Miankuh, Ardal County, Chaharmahal and Bakhtiari province
- Darreh Shur, Lordegan, Chaharmahal and Bakhtiari province
- Darreh Shur-e Khong, Chaharmahal and Bakhtiari province
- Darreh Shur-e Mehdi, Chaharmahal and Bakhtiari province
- Darreh Shur, Fars
- Darreh Shur, Mamasani, Fars province
- Darreh Shur Rural District, Isfahan province
- Darreh Shur, Kerman
- Darreh Shur, Khuzestan
- Darreh Shur, Kohgiluyeh and Boyer-Ahmad
- Darreh Shur, Lorestan
- Darreh Shur, Markazi
