= Emamabad =

Emamabad (Persian: امام اباد) may refer to:

- Emamabad, Bushehr
- Emamabad, Armand, Chaharmahal and Bakhtiari Province
- Emamabad, Falard, Chaharmahal and Bakhtiari Province
- Emamabad, Sardasht, Chaharmahal and Bakhtiari Province
- Emamabad, Golestan
- Emamabad, Bashagard, Hormozgan Province
- Emamabad, Minab, Hormozgan Province
- Emamabad, Kohgiluyeh and Boyer-Ahmad
- Emamabad, Lorestan
- Emamabad, Markazi
- Emamabad, Semnan
