= Deh Chenar =

Deh Chenar or Deh-e Chenar or Deh-i-Chenar (Persian: ده چنار) may refer to:

- Deh Chenar, Chaharmahal and Bakhtiari
- Deh Chenar, Kerman
- Deh Chenar-e Dalvara, Chaharmahal and Bakhtiari Province
- Deh Chenar-e Olya, Chaharmahal and Bakhtiari Province
- Deh Chenar-e Sofla, Chaharmahal and Bakhtiari Province
