= Zarrin Derakht =

Zarrin Derakht زرين درخت
- Village
- Location within Iran
- Coordinates: 31°31′31″N 50°56′54″E
- Country: Iran
- Province: Chaharmahal and Bakhtiari
- County: Khanmirza
- Bakhsh: Central
- Rural District: Khanmirza

Population (2016)
  - Total: 421
- Time zone: UTC+3:30 (IRST)

Zarrin Derakht (Persian: زرين درخت, also Romanized as Zarrīn Derakht) The village is populated by Lurs. is a village in Khanmirza Rural District of Khanmirza County, Chaharmahal and Bakhtiari Province, Iran.

== Population ==
At the time of the 2006 National Census, the village's population was 352 in 81 households, when it was in the former Khanmirza District of Lordegan County. The following census in 2011 counted 355 people in 106 households. The 2016 census measured the population of the village as 421 people in 117 households.

In 2019, the district was separated from the county in the establishment of Khanmirza County, and the rural district was transferred to the new Central District.
