= Gushki, Chaharmahal and Bakhtiari =

Gushki گوشکی
- Village
- Location within Iran
- Coordinates: 31°32′53″N 51°08′58″E
- Country: Iran
- Province: Chaharmahal and Bakhtiari
- County: Khanmirza
- Bakhsh: Central
- Rural District: Khanmirza

Population (2016)
  - Total: 376
- Time zone: UTC+3:30 (IRST)

Gushki (Persian: گوشکی, also Romanized as Gūshkī and Gūshakī; also known as Bāgh Vaḩshī) is a village in Khanmirza Rural District of Khanmirza County, Chaharmahal and Bakhtiari Province, Iran. The village is populated by Lurs.

== Population ==
At the time of the 2006 National Census, the village's population was 373 in 77 households, when it was in the former Khanmirza District of Lordegan County. The following census in 2011 counted 380 people in 98 households. The 2016 census measured the population of the village as 376 people in 112 households.

In 2019, the district was separated from the county in the establishment of Khanmirza County, and the rural district was transferred to the new Central District.
