= Deh Ali, Lordegan =

Deh Ali ده علی
- Village
- Location within Iran
- Coordinates: 31°31′46″N 51°09′04″E
- Country: Iran
- Province: Chaharmahal and Bakhtiari
- County: Khanmirza
- Bakhsh: Central
- Rural District: Khanmirza

Population (2016)
  - Total: 209
- Time zone: UTC+3:30 (IRST)

Deh Ali (Persian: ده علی, also Romanized as Deh ‘Alī) is a village in Khanmirza Rural District of Khanmirza County, Chaharmahal and Bakhtiari Province, Iran. The village is populated by Lurs.

== Population ==
At the time of the 2006 National Census, the village's population was 294 in 62 households, when it was in the former Khanmirza District of Lordegan County. The following census in 2011 counted 255 people in 59 households. The 2016 census measured the population of the village as 209 people in 59 households.

In 2019, the district was separated from the county in the establishment of Khanmirza County, and the rural district was transferred to the new Central District.
