= Jub Nesa =

Jub Nesa جوب نسا
- Village
- Location within Iran
- Coordinates: 31°32′26″N 50°54′08″E
- Country: Iran
- Province: Chaharmahal and Bakhtiari
- County: Khanmirza
- Bakhsh: Armand
- Rural District: Armand

Population (2016)
  - Total: 389
- Time zone: UTC+3:30 (IRST)

Jub Nesa (Persian: جوب نسا, also Romanized as Jūb Nesā; also known as Jān Nesā and Jān Nesā’) is a village in Armand Rural District of Armand District in Khanmirza County, Chaharmahal and Bakhtiari province, Iran.

== Demographics ==
=== Population ===
At the time of the 2006 National Census, the village's population was 307 in 70 households, when it was in the Central District of Lordegan County. The following census in 2011 counted 283 people in 79 households. The 2016 census measured the population of the village as 389 people in 109 households.

In 2019, the rural district was separated from the county in the establishment of Khanmirza County and transferred to the new Armand District.
