= Farsun, Chaharmahal and Bakhtiari =

Farsun فارسون
- Village
- Location within Iran
- Coordinates: 31°41′18″N 50°51′07″E
- Country: Iran
- Province: Chaharmahal and Bakhtiari
- County: Khanmirza
- Bakhsh: Armand
- Rural District: Armand

Population (2016)
  - Total: 747
- Time zone: UTC+3:30 (IRST)

Farsun (Persian: فارسون, also Romanized as Fārsūn; also known as Farsan) is a village in Armand Rural District of Armand District in Khanmirza County, Chaharmahal and Bakhtiari province, Iran.

== Demographics ==
=== Population ===
At the time of the 2006 National Census, the village's population was 583 in 105 households, when it was in the Central District of Lordegan County. The following census in 2011 counted 658 people in 148 households. The 2016 census measured the population of the village as 747 people in 179 households.

In 2019, the rural district was separated from the county in the establishment of Khanmirza County and transferred to the new Armand District.
