= Qaleh-ye Mozal =

Village in Chaharmahal and Bakhtiari, Iran

Qaleh-ye Mozal قلعه مزعل
- Village
- Location within Iran
- Coordinates: 31°30′05″N 51°09′00″E
- Country: Iran
- Province: Chaharmahal and Bakhtiari
- County: Khanmirza
- Bakhsh: Central
- Rural District: Javanmardi

Population (2016)
  - Total: 64
- Time zone: UTC+3:30 (IRST)

Qaleh-ye Mozal (Persian: قلعه مزعل, also Romanized as Qal‘eh-ye Moz‘al; also known as Moz‘al and Qal‘eh-ye Moḩammad Reẕā Khān) is a village in Javanmardi Rural District, Khanmirza County, Chaharmahal and Bakhtiari Province, Iran.

The village is populated by Lurs.

== Population ==
At the time of the 2006 National Census, the village's population was 80 in 12 households, when it was in the former Khanmirza District of Lordegan County. The following census in 2011 counted 51 people in 15 households. The 2016 census measured the population of the village as 64 people in 17 households.

In 2019, the district was separated from the county in the establishment of Khanmirza County, and the rural district was transferred to the new Central District.
