= Bar Aftab-e Khonk =

Bar Aftab-e Khonk برآفتاب خنک
- Village
- Location within Iran
- Coordinates: 31°32′50″N 50°54′29″E
- Country: Iran
- Province: Chaharmahal and Bakhtiari
- County: Khanmirza
- Bakhsh: Armand
- Rural District: Armand

Population (2016)
  - Total: 29
- Time zone: UTC+3:30 (IRST)

Bar Aftab-e Khonk (Persian: برآفتاب خنک, also Romanized as Bar Āftāb-e Khonk; also known as Bar Āftāb-e Khong and Bar Āftāb-e Khonj) is a village in Armand Rural District of Armand District in Khanmirza County, Chaharmahal and Bakhtiari province, Iran.

== Demographics ==
=== Population ===
At the time of the 2006 National Census, the village's population was 42 in 8 households, when it was in the Central District of Lordegan County. The following census in 2011 counted 47 people in 11 households. The 2016 census measured the population of the village as 29 people in 10 households.

In 2019, the rural district was separated from the county in the establishment of Khanmirza County and transferred to the new Armand District.
