= Rahimabad, Lordegan =

Rahimabad رحيم آباد
- Village
- Location within Iran
- Coordinates: 31°32′13″N 50°52′25″E
- Country: Iran
- Province: Chaharmahal and Bakhtiari
- County: Khanmirza
- Bakhsh: Armand
- Rural District: Armand

Population (2016)
  - Total: 484
- Time zone: UTC+3:30 (IRST)

Rahimabad (Persian: رحيم آباد, also Romanized as Raḩīmābād) is a village in Armand Rural District of Armand District in Khanmirza County, Chaharmahal and Bakhtiari province, Iran.

== Demographics ==
=== Population ===
At the time of the 2006 National Census, the village's population was 298 in 74 households, when it was in the Central District of Lordegan County. The following census in 2011 counted 379 people in 87 households. The 2016 census measured the population of the village as 484 people in 128 households.

In 2019, the rural district was separated from the county in the establishment of Khanmirza County and transferred to the new Armand District.
