= Kartogol =

Kartogol كرتگل
- Village
- Location within Iran
- Coordinates: 31°32′25″N 51°02′24″E
- Country: Iran
- Province: Chaharmahal and Bakhtiari
- County: Khanmirza
- Bakhsh: Central
- Rural District: Javanmardi

Population (2016)
  - Total: 166
- Time zone: UTC+3:30 (IRST)

Kartogol (Persian: كرتگل; also known as Kortogol-e Pā’īn) is a village in Javanmardi Rural District, Khanmirza County, Chaharmahal and Bakhtiari Province, Iran.

The village is populated by Lurs.

== Population ==
At the time of the 2006 National Census, the village's population was 127 in 34 households, when it was in the former Khanmirza District of Lordegan County. The following census in 2011 counted 142 people in 43 households. The 2016 census measured the population of the village as 166 people in 46 households.

In 2019, the district was separated from the county in the establishment of Khanmirza County, and the rural district was transferred to the new Central District.
