= Sar Tang-e Mesen =

Village in Chaharmahal and Bakhtiari province, Iran

Sar Tang-e Mesen Persian: سرتنگ مسن
- Village
- Location within Iran
- Coordinates: 31°42′24″N 50°44′09″E
- Country: Iran
- Province: Chaharmahal and Bakhtiari
- County: Khanmirza
- District: Armand
- Rural District: Sepidar

Population (2016)
  - Total: 893
- Time zone: UTC+3:30 (IRST)

Sar Tang-e Mesen (Persian: سرتنگ مسن) (Note: Also known as Sar Tan and Sar Tang) is a village in Sepidar Rural District of Armand District in Khanmirza County, Chaharmahal and Bakhtiari province, Iran.

== Demographics ==
=== Population ===
At the time of the 2006 National Census, the village's population was 703 in 141 households, when it was in Armand Rural District of the Central District in Lordegan County. The following census in 2011 counted 858 people in 186 households. The 2016 census measured the population of the village as 893 people in 221 households.

In 2019, the rural district was separated from the county in the establishment of Khanmirza County and transferred to the new Armand District. Sar Tang-e Mesen was transferred to Sepidar Rural District created in the same district.
