= Deh Now-e Hushang Khan =

Deh Now-e Hushang Khan ده نو هوشنگ خان
- Village
- Interactive map of Deh Now-e Hushang Khan
- Coordinates: 31.522°N 51.006°E
- Country: Iran
- Province: Chaharmahal and Bakhtiari
- County: Khanmirza
- Bakhsh: Central
- Rural District: Khanmirza

Population (2016)
  - Total: 591
- Time zone: UTC+3:30 (IRST)

Deh Now-e Hushang Khan (Persian: ده نو هوشنگ خان, also Romanized as Deh Now-e Hūshang Khān) is a village in Khanmirza Rural District of Khanmirza County, Chaharmahal and Bakhtiari Province, Iran. The village is populated by Lurs.

== Population ==
At the time of the 2006 National Census, the village's population was 502 in 99 households, when it was in the former Khanmirza District of Lordegan County. The following census in 2011 counted 530 people in 125 households. The 2016 census measured the population of the village as 591 people in 141 households.

In 2019, the district was separated from the county in the establishment of Khanmirza County, and the rural district was transferred to the new Central District.
