= Sartang-e Dinar Ali =

Sartang-e Dinar Ali سرتنگ دينارعالی
- Village
- Location within Iran
- Coordinates: 31°31′54″N 51°02′56″E
- Country: Iran
- Province: Chaharmahal and Bakhtiari
- County: Khanmirza
- Bakhsh: Central
- Rural District: Khanmirza

Population (2016)
  - Total: 812
- Time zone: UTC+3:30 (IRST)

Sartang-e Dinar Ali (Persian: سرتنگ دينارعالی, also Romanized as Sartang-e Dīnār ‘Ālī; also known as Deh-e Armandchī and Sartang) is a village in Khanmirza Rural District of Khanmirza County, Chaharmahal and Bakhtiari Province, Iran. The village is populated by Lurs.

== Population ==
At the time of the 2006 National Census, the village's population was 784 in 123 households, when it was in the former Khanmirza District of Lordegan County. The following census in 2011 counted 760 people in 167 households. The 2016 census measured the population of the village as 812 people in 197 households.

In 2019, the district was separated from the county in the establishment of Khanmirza County, and the rural district was transferred to the new Central District.
