= Shahrak-e Sunk =

Village in Chaharmahal and Bakhtiari province, Iran

Shahrak-e Sunk Persian: شهرك سونك
- Village
- Location within Iran
- Coordinates: 31°40′52″N 50°45′41″E
- Country: Iran
- Province: Chaharmahal and Bakhtiari
- County: Khanmirza
- District: Armand
- Rural District: Sepidar

Population (2016)
  - Total: 1,602
- Time zone: UTC+3:30 (IRST)

Shahrak-e Sunk (Persian: شهرك سونك) (Note: Also romanized as Shahrak-e Sūnk) is a village in, and the capital of, Sepidar Rural District in Armand District of Khanmirza County, Chaharmahal and Bakhtiari province, Iran.

== Demographics ==
=== Population ===
At the time of the 2006 National Census, the village's population was 1,379 in 279 households, when it was in Armand Rural District of the Central District in Lordegan County. The following census in 2011 counted 1,527 people in 389 households. The 2016 census measured the population of the village as 1,602 people in 392 households.

In 2019, the rural district was separated from the county in the establishment of Khanmirza County and transferred to the new Armand District. Shahrak-e Sunk was transferred to Sepidar Rural District created in the same district.
