= Dashtineh =

Dashtineh دشتينه
- Village
- Interactive map of Dashtineh
- Coordinates: 31.675°N 50.811°E
- Country: Iran
- Province: Chaharmahal and Bakhtiari
- County: Khanmirza
- Bakhsh: Armand
- Rural District: Armand

Population (2016)
  - Total: 391
- Time zone: UTC+3:30 (IRST)

Dashtineh (Persian: دشتينه, also Romanized as Dashtīneh) is a village in Armand Rural District of Armand District in Khanmirza County, Chaharmahal and Bakhtiari province, Iran.

== Demographics ==
=== Population ===
At the time of the 2006 National Census, the village's population was 274 in 55 households, when it was in the Central District of Lordegan County. The following census in 2011 counted 342 people in 78 households. The 2016 census measured the population of the village as 371 people in 91 households.

In 2019, the rural district was separated from the county in the establishment of Khanmirza County and transferred to the new Armand District.
