= Darakeh, Chaharmahal and Bakhtiari =

Darakeh دركه
- Village
- Location within Iran
- Coordinates: 31°32′08″N 50°55′27″E
- Country: Iran
- Province: Chaharmahal and Bakhtiari
- County: Khanmirza
- Bakhsh: Central
- Rural District: Khanmirza

Population (2006)
  - Total: 282
- Time zone: UTC+3:30 (IRST)

Darakeh (Persian: دركه, also Romanized as Derkeh) is a village in Khanmirza Rural District of Khanmirza County, Chaharmahal and Bakhtiari Province, Iran.

== Population ==
At the time of the 2006 National Census, the village's population was 282 in 57 households, when it was in the former Khanmirza District of Lordegan County. The following census in 2011 counted 284 people in 76 households. The 2016 census measured the population of the village as 477 people in 126 households.

In 2019, the district was separated from the county in the establishment of Khanmirza County, and the rural district was transferred to the new Central District.
