= Salehat =

Salehat صالحات
- Village
- Location within Iran
- Coordinates: 31°31′57″N 50°58′25″E
- Country: Iran
- Province: Chaharmahal and Bakhtiari
- County: Khanmirza
- Bakhsh: Central
- Rural District: Khanmirza

Population (2016)
  - Total: 463
- Time zone: UTC+3:30 (IRST)

Salehat (Persian: صالحات, also Romanized as Şāleḩāt) is a village in Khanmirza Rural District of Khanmirza County, Chaharmahal and Bakhtiari Province, Iran. The village is populated by Lurs.

== Population ==
At the time of the 2006 National Census, the village's population was 343 in 68 households, when it was in the former Khanmirza District of Lordegan County. The following census in 2011 counted 385 people in 98 households. The 2016 census measured the population of the village as 463 people in 122 households.

In 2019, the district was separated from the county in the establishment of Khanmirza County, and the rural district was transferred to the new Central District.
