= Deh-e Torkan, Chaharmahal and Bakhtiari =

Deh-e Torkan ده تركان
- Village
- Location within Iran
- Coordinates: 31°29′33″N 51°07′23″E
- Country: Iran
- Province: Chaharmahal and Bakhtiari
- County: Khanmirza
- Bakhsh: Central
- Rural District: Javanmardi

Population (2016)
  - Total: 475
- Time zone: UTC+3:30 (IRST)

Deh-e Torkan (Persian: ده تركان, also Romanized as Deh-e Torkān; also known as Deh-e Torkhā) is a village in Javanmardi Rural District, Khanmirza County, Chaharmahal and Bakhtiari Province, Iran.

The village is populated by Lurs.

== Population ==
At the time of the 2006 National Census, the village's population was 497 in 92 households, when it was in the former Khanmirza District of Lordegan County. The following census in 2011 counted 357 people in 95 households. The 2016 census measured the population of the village as 475 people in 133 households.

In 2019, the district was separated from the county in the establishment of Khanmirza County, and the rural district was transferred to the new Central District.
