= Do Makan =

Village in Chaharmahal and Bakhtiari province, Iran

Do Makan Persian: دو مکان
- Village
- Location within Iran
- Coordinates: 31°34′17″N 51°06′50″E
- Country: Iran
- Province: Chaharmahal and Bakhtiari
- County: Khanmirza
- District: Central
- Rural District: Khanmirza

Population (2016)
  - Total: 2,764
- Time zone: UTC+3:30 (IRST)

Do Makan (Persian: دومكان) (Note: Also romanized as Do Makān and Dowmakān; also known as Morādādān, Morādūn, and Shah Gharieh) is a village in, and the capital of, Khanmirza Rural District in the Central District of Khanmirza County, Chaharmahal and Bakhtiari province, Iran. The previous capital of the rural district was the village of Aluni, now a city.

== Demographics ==
=== Ethnicity ===
The village is populated by Lurs.

=== Population ===
At the time of the 2006 National Census, the village's population was 1,549 in 309 households, when it was in the former Khanmirza District of Lordegan County. The following census in 2011 counted 2,730 people in 660 households. The 2016 census measured the population of the village as 2,764 people in 736 households. It was the most populous village in its rural district.

In 2019, the district was separated from the county in the establishment of Khanmirza County, and the rural district was transferred to the new Central District.
