= Kalamui =

Village in Chaharmahal and Bakhtiari province, Iran

Kalamui Persian: كلامويي
- Village
- Location within Iran
- Coordinates: 31°36′25″N 51°04′26″E
- Country: Iran
- Province: Chaharmahal and Bakhtiari
- County: Khanmirza
- District: Central
- Rural District: Khanmirza

Population (2016)
  - Total: 919
- Time zone: UTC+3:30 (IRST)

Kalamui (Persian: كلامويي) (Note: Also romanized as Kalāmū’ī; also known as Bāgh Ḩeyrān and Bāgh-e Ḩeyrān) is a village in Khanmirza Rural District of the Central District in Khanmirza County, Chaharmahal and Bakhtiari province, Iran.

== Demographics ==
=== Ethnicity ===
The village is populated by Lurs.

=== Population ===
At the time of the 2006 National Census, the village's population was 839 in 175 households, when it was in the former Khanmirza District of Lordegan County. The following census in 2011 counted 877 people in 224 households. The 2016 census measured the population of the village as 919 people in 254 households.

In 2019, the district was separated from the county in the establishment of Khanmirza County, and the rural district was transferred to the new Central District.
