= Javanmardi =

Village in Chaharmahal and Bakhtiari province, Iran

Javanmardi Persian: جوانمردي
- Village
- Location within Iran
- Coordinates: 31°27′31″N 51°08′44″E
- Country: Iran
- Province: Chaharmahal and Bakhtiari
- County: Khanmirza
- District: Central
- Rural District: Javanmardi

Population (2016)
  - Total: 2,385
- Time zone: UTC+3:30 (IRST)

Javanmardi (Persian: جوانمردي) (Note: Also romanized as Javānmardī) is a village in, and the capital of, Javanmardi Rural District in the Central District of Khanmirza County, Chaharmahal and Bakhtiari province, Iran.

== Demographics ==
=== Ethnicity ===
The village is populated by Lurs.

=== Population ===
At the time of the 2006 National Census, the village's population was 2,179 in 520 households, when it was in the former Khanmirza District of Lordegan County. The following census in 2011 counted 2,337 people in 569 households. The 2016 census measured the population of the village as 2,385 people in 714 households.

In 2019, the district was separated from the county in the establishment of Khanmirza County, and the rural district was transferred to the new Central District.
