= Berjui =

Village in Chaharmahal and Bakhtiari province, Iran

Berjui Persian: برجوئي
- Village
- Location within Iran
- Coordinates: 31°34′55″N 51°03′42″E
- Country: Iran
- Province: Chaharmahal and Bakhtiari
- County: Khanmirza
- District: Central
- Rural District: Khanmirza

Population (2016)
  - Total: 2,650
- Time zone: UTC+3:30 (IRST)

Berjui (Persian: برجوئي) (Note: Also romanized as Barjū’ī and Berjū’ī) is a village in Khanmirza Rural District of the Central District in Khanmirza County, Chaharmahal and Bakhtiari province, Iran.

== Demographics ==
=== Ethnicity ===
The village is populated by Lurs.

=== Population ===
At the time of the 2006 National Census, the village's population was 2,146 in 428 households, when it was in the former Khanmirza District of Lordegan County. The following census in 2011 counted 2,643 people in 566 households. The 2016 census measured the population of the village as 2,650 people in 656 households.

In 2019, the district was separated from the county in the establishment of Khanmirza County, and the rural district was transferred to the new Central District.
