= Buger =

Village in Chaharmahal and Bakhtiari province, Iran

Buger Persian: بوگر
- Village
- Location within Iran
- Coordinates: 31°40′30″N 50°44′06″E
- Country: Iran
- Province: Chaharmahal and Bakhtiari
- County: Khanmirza
- District: Armand
- Rural District: Sepidar

Population (2016)
  - Total: 2,775
- Time zone: UTC+3:30 (IRST)

Buger (Persian: بوگر) (Note: Also romanized as Būger) is a village in Sepidar Rural District of Armand District in Khanmirza County, Chaharmahal and Bakhtiari province, Iran.

== Demographics ==
=== Population ===
At the time of the 2006 National Census, the village's population was 2,301 in 448 households, when it was in Armand Rural District of the Central District in Lordegan County. The following census in 2011 counted 2,639 people in 625 households. The 2016 census measured the population of the village as 2,775 people in 734 households. It was the most populous village in its rural district.

In 2019, the rural district was separated from the county in the establishment of Khanmirza County and transferred to the new Armand District. Buger was transferred to Sepidar Rural District created in the same district.
