= Qaleh Cheh =

Qaleh Cheh or Qalehcheh (Persian: قلعه چه) may refer to:

- Qalehcheh, Ardabil
- Qalehcheh, Lordegan, Chaharmahal and Bakhtiari Province
- Qalehcheh, Khanmirza, Lordegan County, Chaharmahal and Bakhtiari Province
- Qalehcheh, East Azerbaijan
- Qaleh Cheh, Golestan
- Qaleh Cheh, Kerman
- Qalehcheh-ye Muzarm, Khuzestan Province
- Qalehcheh, Markazi
- Qaleh Cheh, North Khorasan
- Qalehcheh, Razavi Khorasan

== See also ==
- Qalehchi (disambiguation)
