= Deh Sahra =

Village in Chaharmahal and Bakhtiari province, Iran

Deh Sahra Persian: ده صحرا
- Village
- Location within Iran
- Coordinates: 31°30′36″N 51°06′38″E
- Country: Iran
- Province: Chaharmahal and Bakhtiari
- County: Khanmirza
- District: Central
- Rural District: Khanmirza

Population (2016)
  - Total: 2,697
- Time zone: UTC+3:30 (IRST)

Deh Sahra (Persian: ده صحرا) (Note: Also romanized as Deh Şaḩrā) is a village in Khanmirza Rural District of the Central District in Khanmirza County, Chaharmahal and Bakhtiari province, Iran.

== Demographics ==
=== Ethnicity ===
The village is populated by Lurs.

=== Population ===
At the time of the 2006 National Census, the village's population was 2,438 in 455 households, when it was in the former Khanmirza District of Lordegan County. The following census in 2011 counted 2,461 people in 628 households. The 2016 census measured the population of the village as 2,697 people in 643 households.

In 2019, the district was separated from the county in the establishment of Khanmirza County, and the rural district was transferred to the new Central District.
