= Qaleh-ye Afghan =

Village in Chaharmahal and Bakhtiari province, Iran

Qaleh-ye Afghan Persian: قلعه افغان
- Village
- Location within Iran
- Coordinates: 31°29′13″N 51°07′59″E
- Country: Iran
- Province: Chaharmahal and Bakhtiari
- County: Khanmirza
- District: Central
- Rural District: Javanmardi

Population (2016)
  - Total: 511
- Time zone: UTC+3:30 (IRST)

Qaleh-ye Afghan (Persian: قلعه افغان) (Note: Also romanized as Qal‘eh-ye Afghān) is a village in Javanmardi Rural District of the Central District in Khanmirza County, Chaharmahal and Bakhtiari province, Iran.

== Demographics ==
=== Ethnicity ===
The village is populated by Lurs.

=== Population ===
At the time of the 2006 National Census, the village's population was 545 in 111 households, when it was in the former Khanmirza District of Lordegan County. The following census in 2011 counted 466 people in 122 households. The 2016 census measured the population of the village as 511 people in 144 households.

In 2019, the district was separated from the county in the establishment of Khanmirza County, and the rural district was transferred to the new Central District.
