= Hasan Hendow =

Village in Chaharmahal and Bakhtiari province, Iran

Hasan Hendow Persian: حسن هندو
- Village
- Location within Iran
- Coordinates: 31°28′03″N 51°07′53″E
- Country: Iran
- Province: Chaharmahal and Bakhtiari
- County: Khanmirza
- District: Central
- Rural District: Javanmardi

Population (2016)
  - Total: 1,535
- Time zone: UTC+3:30 (IRST)

Hasan Hendow (Persian: حسن هندو) (Note: Also romanized as Ḩasan Hendow; also known as Ḩasan Hendow‘ī and Ḩasan Hendū’ī) is a village in Javanmardi Rural District of the Central District in Khanmirza County, Chaharmahal and Bakhtiari province, Iran.

== Demographics ==
=== Ethnicity ===
The village is populated by Lurs.

=== Population ===
At the time of the 2006 National Census, the village's population was 1,297 in 674 households, when it was in the former Khanmirza District of Lordegan County. The following census in 2011 counted 1,361 people in 321 households. The 2016 census measured the population of the village as 1,535 people in 432 households.

In 2019, the district was separated from the county in the establishment of Khanmirza County, and the rural district was transferred to the new Central District.
