= Tang Kolureh =

Village in Chaharmahal and Bakhtiari province, Iran

Tang Kolureh Persian: تنگ كلوره
- Village
- Location within Iran
- Coordinates: 31°33′19″N 50°52′57″E
- Country: Iran
- Province: Chaharmahal and Bakhtiari
- County: Khanmirza
- District: Armand
- Rural District: Armand

Population (2016)
  - Total: 975
- Time zone: UTC+3:30 (IRST)

Tang Kolureh (Persian: تنگ كلوره) (Note: Also romanized as Tang Kolūreh) is a village in, and the former capital of, Armand Rural District in Armand District of Khanmirza County, Chaharmahal and Bakhtiari province, Iran. The capital of the rural district has been transferred to the village of Armand.

== Demographics ==
=== Population ===
At the time of the 2006 National Census, the village's population was 834 in 180 households, when it was in the Central District of Lordegan County. The following census in 2011 counted 830 people in 210 households. The 2016 census measured the population of the village as 975 people in 254 households.

In 2019, the rural district was separated from the county in the establishment of Khanmirza County and was transferred to the new Armand District.
