= Bagh-e Behzad =

Village in Chaharmahal and Bakhtiari province, Iran

Bagh-e Behzad Persian: باغ بهزاد
- Village
- Location within Iran
- Coordinates: 31°26′59″N 51°10′12″E
- Country: Iran
- Province: Chaharmahal and Bakhtiari
- County: Khanmirza
- District: Central
- Rural District: Javanmardi

Population (2016)
  - Total: 2,454
- Time zone: UTC+3:30 (IRST)

Bagh-e Behzad (Persian: باغ بهزاد) (Note: Also romanized as Bāgh Behzād and Bāgh-e Behzād) is a village in Javanmardi Rural District of the Central District in Khanmirza County, Chaharmahal and Bakhtiari province, Iran.

== Demographics ==
=== Ethnicity ===
The village is populated by Lurs.

=== Population ===
At the time of the 2006 National Census, the village's population was 1,911 in 354 households, when it was in the former Khanmirza District of Lordegan County. The following census in 2011 counted 2,202 people in 576 households. The 2016 census measured the population of the village as 2,454 people in 732 households. It was the most populous village in its rural district.

In 2019, the district was separated from the county in the establishment of Khanmirza County, and the rural district was transferred to the new Central District.
