= Moradan =

Village in Chaharmahal and Bakhtiari province, Iran

Moradan Persian: مرادون
- Village
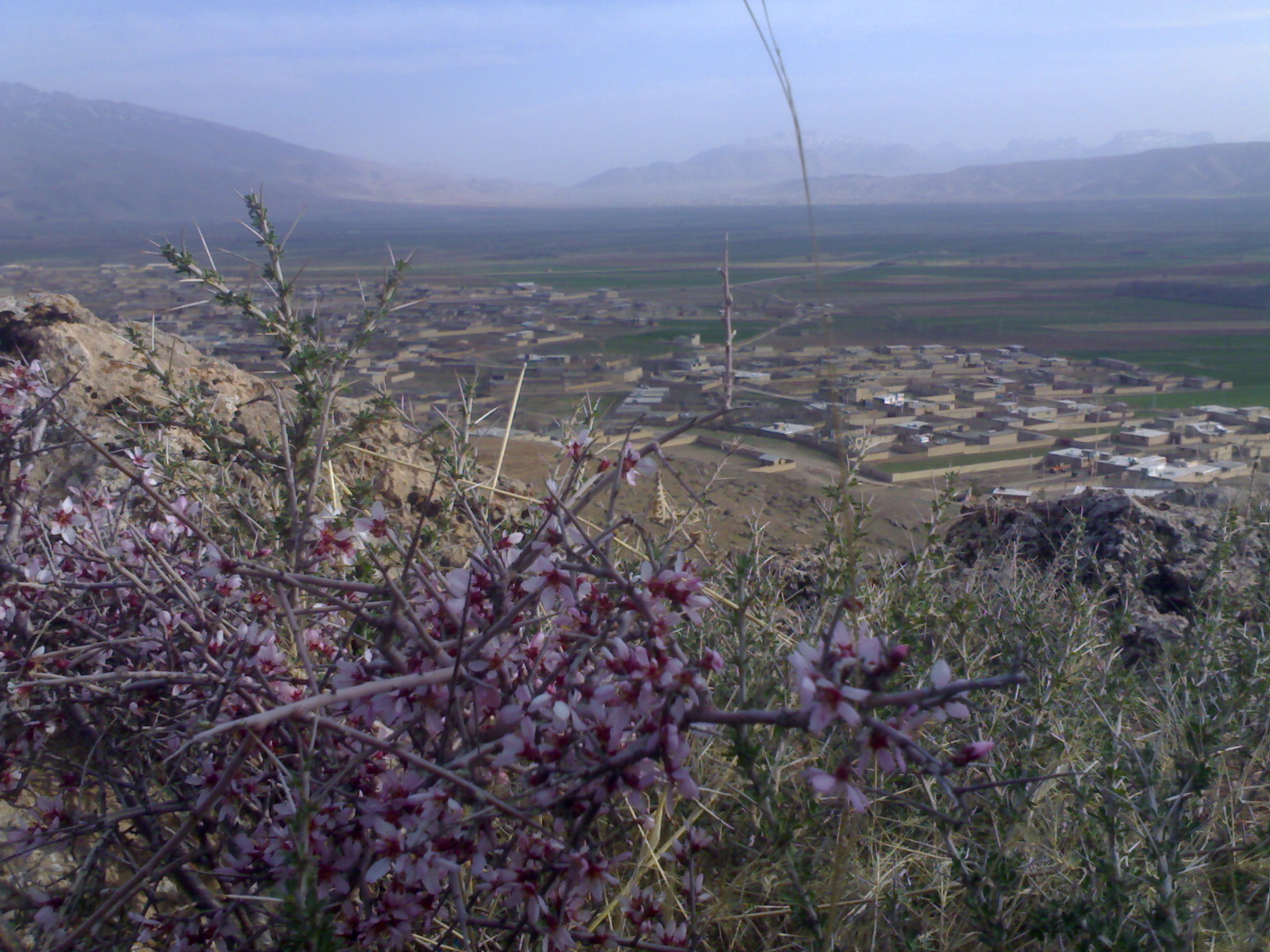
- The village of Moradan (Shah Qaryeh) from above

- Location within Iran
- Coordinates: 31°34′19″N 51°06′33″E
- Country: Iran
- Province: Chaharmahal and Bakhtiari
- County: Khanmirza
- District: Central
- Rural District: Khanmirza

Population (2016)
  - Total: 1,961
- Time zone: UTC+3:30 (IRST)

Moradan (Persian: مرادون) (Note: Also romanized as Morādān; formerly known as Shah Qaryeh (شاه قريه), also romanized as Shāh Qaryeh) is a village in Khanmirza Rural District of the Central District in Khanmirza County, Chaharmahal and Bakhtiari province, Iran.

== Demographics ==
=== Ethnicity ===
The village is populated by Lurs.

=== Population ===
At the time of the 2006 National Census, the village's population, as Shah Qaryeh, was 2,599 in 566 households, when it was in the former Khanmirza District of Lordegan County. The following census in 2011 counted 1,890 people in 448 households. The 2016 census measured the population of the village as 1,961 people in 592 households, by which time the village was listed as Moradan.

In 2019, the district was separated from the county in the establishment of Khanmirza County, and the rural district was transferred to the new Central District.
