= Aliabad-e Poshteh =

Village in Chaharmahal and Bakhtiari province, Iran

Aliabad-e Poshteh Persian: علی‌آباد پشته
- Village
- Location within Iran
- Coordinates: 31°35′01″N 51°08′19″E
- Country: Iran
- Province: Chaharmahal and Bakhtiari
- County: Khanmirza
- District: Central
- Rural District: Khanmirza

Population (2016)
  - Total: 225
- Time zone: UTC+3:30 (IRST)

Aliabad-e Poshteh (Persian: علی‌آباد پشته) (Note: Also romanized as ‘Alīābād-e Poshteh; also known as Jūy Poshteh and Poshteh) is a village in Khanmirza Rural District of the Central District in Khanmirza County, Chaharmahal and Bakhtiari province, Iran.

== Demographics ==
=== Ethnicity ===
The village is populated by Lurs.

=== Population ===
At the time of the 2006 National Census, the village's population was 269 in 63 households, when it was in the former Khanmirza District of Lordegan County. The following census in 2011 counted 256 people in 70 households. The 2016 census measured the population of the village as 225 people in 67 households.

In 2019, the district was separated from the county in the establishment of Khanmirza County, and the rural district was transferred to the new Central District.
