= Armand-e Sofla =

Village in Chaharmahal and Bakhtiari province, Iran

Armand-e Sofla Persian: ارمندسفلي
- Village
- Location within Iran
- Coordinates: 31°38′40″N 50°47′19″E
- Country: Iran
- Province: Chaharmahal and Bakhtiari
- County: Khanmirza
- District: Armand
- Rural District: Armand

Population (2016)
  - Total: 1,201
- Time zone: UTC+3:30 (IRST)

Armand-e Sofla (Persian: ارمندسفلي) (Note: Also romanized as Armand Sofla and Armand-e Soflá; also known as Armand and Ārmand-e Pā’īn) is a village in Armand Rural District of Armand District in Khanmirza County, Chaharmahal and Bakhtiari province, Iran.

== Demographics ==
=== Population ===
At the time of the 2006 National Census, the village's population was 1,077 in 243 households, when it was in the Central District of Lordegan County. The following census in 2011 counted 1,218 people in 308 households. The 2016 census measured the population of the village as 1,201 people in 342 households.

In 2019, the rural district was separated from the county in the establishment of Khanmirza County and transferred to the new Armand District.
