= Deh Rashid, Chaharmahal and Bakhtiari =

Deh Rashid ده رشيد
- Village
- Location within Iran
- Coordinates: 31°31′23″N 51°09′19″E
- Country: Iran
- Province: Chaharmahal and Bakhtiari
- County: Khanmirza
- Bakhsh: Central
- Rural District: Khanmirza

Population (2016)
  - Total: 423
- Time zone: UTC+3:30 (IRST)

Deh Rashid (Persian: ده رشيد, also Romanized as Deh Rashīd; also known as Rashīd Rīgī) is a village in Khanmirza Rural District of Khanmirza County, Chaharmahal and Bakhtiari Province, Iran. The local population is mainly composed of Lurs.

== Population ==
At the time of the 2006 National Census, the village's population was 428 in 88 households, when it was in the former Khanmirza District of Lordegan County. The following census in 2011 counted 426 people in 116 households. The 2016 census measured the population of the village as 423 people in 123 households.

In 2019, the district was separated from the county in the establishment of Khanmirza County, and the rural district was transferred to the new Central District.
