= Emamabad, Armand =

Emamabad امام آباد
- Village
- Location within Iran
- Coordinates: 31°35′00″N 50°53′06″E
- Country: Iran
- Province: Chaharmahal and Bakhtiari
- County: Khanmirza
- Bakhsh: Armand
- Rural District: Armand

Population (2016)
  - Total: 727
- Time zone: UTC+3:30 (IRST)

Emamabad (Persian: امام آباد, also Romanized as Emāmābād; also known as Darreh Razgah and Darreh Razgeh) is a village in Armand Rural District of Armand District in Khanmirza County, Chaharmahal and Bakhtiari province, Iran.

== Demographics ==
=== Population ===
At the time of the 2006 National Census, the village's population was 553 in 108 households, when it was in the Central District of Lordegan County. The following census in 2011 counted 605 people in 151 households. The 2016 census measured the population of the village as 727 people in 190 households.

In 2019, the rural district was separated from the county in the establishment of Khanmirza County and transferred to the new Armand District.
