= Salah Chin =

Village in Chaharmahal and Bakhtiari province, Iran

Salah Chin Persian: سلح چين
- Village
- Location within Iran
- Coordinates: 31°29′00″N 51°08′37″E
- Country: Iran
- Province: Chaharmahal and Bakhtiari
- County: Khanmirza
- District: Central
- Rural District: Javanmardi

Population (2016)
  - Total: 711
- Time zone: UTC+3:30 (IRST)

Salah Chin (Persian: سلح چين) (Note: Also romanized as Salaḩ Chīn; also known as Sang Būr and Sankbor) is a village in Javanmardi Rural District of the Central District in Khanmirza County, Chaharmahal and Bakhtiari province, Iran.

== Demographics ==
=== Ethnicity ===
The village is populated by Lurs.

=== Population ===
At the time of the 2006 National Census, the village's population was 696 in 133 households, when it was in the former Khanmirza District of Lordegan County. The following census in 2011 counted 765 people in 176 households. The 2016 census measured the population of the village as 711 people in 193 households.

In 2019, the district was separated from the county in the establishment of Khanmirza County, and the rural district was transferred to the new Central District.
