= Baba Mansur =

Village in Chaharmahal and Bakhtiari province, Iran

Baba Mansur Persian: بابامنصور
- Village
- Location within Iran
- Coordinates: 31°27′36″N 51°09′09″E
- Country: Iran
- Province: Chaharmahal and Bakhtiari
- County: Khanmirza
- District: Central
- Rural District: Javanmardi

Population (2016)
  - Total: 655
- Time zone: UTC+3:30 (IRST)

Baba Mansur (Persian: بابامنصور) (Note: Also romanized as Bābā Manşūr; also known as Bābā Manşūrī and Bāmasīr) is a village in Javanmardi Rural District of the Central District in Khanmirza County, Chaharmahal and Bakhtiari province, Iran.

== Demographics ==
=== Ethnicity ===
The village is populated by Lurs.

=== Population ===
At the time of the 2006 National Census, the village's population was 508 in 121 households, when it was in the former Khanmirza District of Lordegan County. The following census in 2011 counted 419 people in 110 households. The 2016 census measured the population of the village as 655 people in 180 households.

In 2019, the district was separated from the county in the establishment of Khanmirza County, and the rural district was transferred to the new Central District.
