= Kerat Gol-e Sofla =

Village in Chaharmahal and Bakhtiari province, Iran

Kerat Gol-e Sofla Persian: كرتگل سفلي
- Village
- Location within Iran
- Coordinates: 31°32′25″N 51°02′25″E
- Country: Iran
- Province: Chaharmahal and Bakhtiari
- County: Khanmirza
- District: Central
- Rural District: Khanmirza

Population (2016)
  - Total: 1,249
- Time zone: UTC+3:30 (IRST)

Kerat Gol-e Sofla (Persian: كرتگل سفلي) (Note: Also romanized as Kerat Gol-e Soflá; also known as Kerat Gol) is a village in Khanmirza Rural District of the Central District in Khanmirza County, Chaharmahal and Bakhtiari province, Iran.

== Population ==
At the time of the 2006 National Census, the village's population was 1,151 in 210 households, when it was in the former Khanmirza District of Lordegan County. The following census in 2011 counted 1,134 people in 263 households. The 2016 census measured the population of the village as 1,249 people in 326 households.

In 2019, the district was separated from the county in the establishment of Khanmirza County, and the rural district was transferred to the new Central District.
