= Deh Chenar-e Olya =

Deh Chenar-e Olya ده چنارعليا
- Village
- Location within Iran
- Coordinates: 31°34′12″N 51°08′29″E
- Country: Iran
- Province: Chaharmahal and Bakhtiari
- County: Khanmirza
- Bakhsh: Central
- Rural District: Khanmirza

Population (2016)
  - Total: 57
- Time zone: UTC+3:30 (IRST)

Deh Chenar-e Olya (Persian: ده چنارعليا, also Romanized as Deh Chenār-e ‘Olyā and Deh Chenār ‘Olyā; also known as Deh Chenār-e Bālā, Deh-e Chenār, Deh-i-Chenār, and Shahrū’ī-ye Bālā) is a village in Khanmirza Rural District of Khanmirza County, Chaharmahal and Bakhtiari Province, Iran. The village is populated by Lurs.

== Population ==
At the time of the 2006 National Census, the village's population was 54 in 11 households, when it was in the former Khanmirza District of Lordegan County. The following census in 2011 counted 50 people in 13 households. The 2016 census measured the population of the village as 57 people in 14 households.

In 2019, the district was separated from the county in the establishment of Khanmirza County, and the rural district was transferred to the new Central District.
