= Kinak =

Village in Chaharmahal and Bakhtiari province, Iran

Kinak Persian: كينك
- Village
- Location within Iran
- Coordinates: 31°36′59″N 50°47′09″E
- Country: Iran
- Province: Chaharmahal and Bakhtiari
- County: Khanmirza
- District: Armand
- Rural District: Armand

Population (2016)
  - Total: 1,262
- Time zone: UTC+3:30 (IRST)

Kinak (Persian: كينك) (Note: Also romanized as Kīnak and Kink) is a village in Armand Rural District of Armand District in Khanmirza County, Chaharmahal and Bakhtiari province, Iran.

== Demographics ==
=== Population ===
At the time of the 2006 National Census, the village's population was 1,072 in 243 households, when it was in the Central District of Lordegan County. The following census in 2011 counted 1,152 people in 290 households. The 2016 census measured the population of the village as 1,262 people in 329 households.

In 2019, the rural district was separated from the county in the establishment of Khanmirza County and transferred to the new Armand District.
