= Mesen, Chaharmahal and Bakhtiari =

Village in Chaharmahal and Bakhtiari province, Iran

Mesen Persian: مسن
- Village
- Location within Iran
- Coordinates: 31°40′36″N 50°44′41″E
- Country: Iran
- Province: Chaharmahal and Bakhtiari
- County: Khanmirza
- District: Armand
- Rural District: Sepidar

Population (2016)
  - Total: 1,309
- Time zone: UTC+3:30 (IRST)

Mesen (Persian: مسن) (Note: Also romanized as Masen; also known as Mesīn, and Misin) is a village in Sepidar Rural District of Armand District in Khanmirza County, Chaharmahal and Bakhtiari province, Iran.

== Demographics ==
=== Population ===
At the time of the 2006 National Census, the village's population was 1,126 in 231 households, when it was in Armand Rural District of the Central District in Lordegan County. The following census in 2011 counted 1,288 people in 300 households. The 2016 census measured the population of the village as 1,309 people in 337 households.

In 2019, the rural district was separated from the county in the establishment of Khanmirza County, and the rural district was transferred to the new Armand District. Mesen was transferred to Sepidar Rural District created in the same district.
