= Ab Chenar, Chaharmahal and Bakhtiari =

Village in Chaharmahal and Bakhtiari province, Iran

Ab Chenar Persian: اب چنار
- Village
- Location within Iran
- Coordinates: 31°35′51″N 50°49′44″E
- Country: Iran
- Province: Chaharmahal and Bakhtiari
- County: Khanmirza
- District: Armand
- Rural District: Armand

Population (2016)
  - Total: 1,163
- Time zone: UTC+3:30 (IRST)

Ab Chenar (Persian: اب چنار) (Note: Also romanized as Āb Chenār) is a village in Armand Rural District of Armand District in Khanmirza County, Chaharmahal and Bakhtiari province, Iran.

== Demographics ==
=== Population ===
At the time of the 2006 National Census, the village's population was 908 in 170 households, when it was in the Central District of Lordegan County. The following census in 2011 counted 1,023 people in 239 households. The 2016 census measured the population of the village as 1,163 people in 294 households.

In 2019, the rural district was separated from the county in the establishment of Khanmirza County and transferred to the new Armand District.
