= Deh Chenar-e Sofla =

Village in Chaharmahal and Bakhtiari, Iran

Deh Chenar-e Sofla ده چنار سفلی
- Village
- Location within Iran
- Coordinates: 31°33′21″N 51°08′36″E
- Country: Iran
- Province: Chaharmahal and Bakhtiari
- County: Khanmirza
- Bakhsh: Central
- Rural District: Khanmirza

Population (2016)
  - Total: 584
- Time zone: UTC+3:30 (IRST)

Deh Chenar-e Sofla (Persian: ده چنار سفلی, also Romanized as Deh Chenār-e Soflá; also known as Deh Chenār, Deh Chenār-e Pā’īn, Shahrū’ī-ye Pā’īn, and Shahrūyeh) is a village in Khanmirza Rural District of Khanmirza County, Chaharmahal and Bakhtiari Province, Iran. The village is populated by Lurs.

== Population ==
At the time of the 2006 National Census, the village's population was 732 in 138 households, when it was in the former Khanmirza District of Lordegan County. The following census in 2011 counted 678 people in 154 households. The 2016 census measured the population of the village as 584 people in 156 households.

In 2019, the district was separated from the county in the establishment of Khanmirza County, and the rural district was transferred to the new Central District.
