= Bard Bor =

Village in Chaharmahal and Bakhtiari province, Iran

Bard Bor Persian: بردبر
- Village
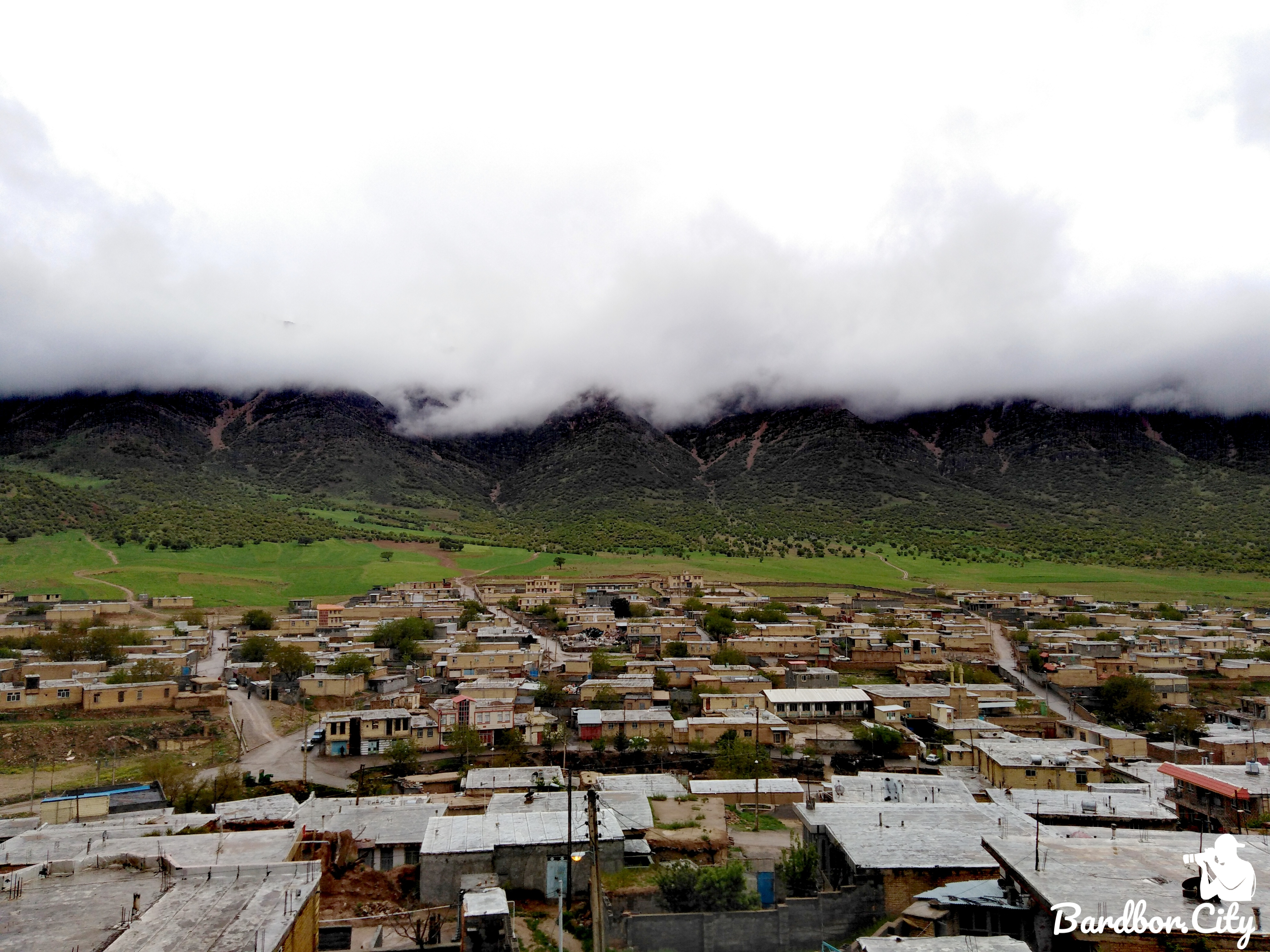

- Location within Iran
- Coordinates: 31°30′08″N 51°00′00″E
- Country: Iran
- Province: Chaharmahal and Bakhtiari
- County: Khanmirza
- District: Central
- Rural District: Khanmirza

Population (2016)
  - Total: 2,696
- Time zone: UTC+3:30 (IRST)

Bard Bor (Persian: بردبر) (Note: Also romanized Bardbor) is a village in Khanmirza Rural District of the Central District in Khanmirza County, Chaharmahal and Bakhtiari province, Iran.

== Demographics ==
=== Ethnicity ===
The village is populated by Lurs.

=== Population ===
At the time of the 2006 National Census, the village's population was 2,348 in 483 households, when it was in the former Khanmirza District of Lordegan County. The following census in 2011 counted 2,205 people in 534 households. The 2016 census measured the population of the village as 2,696 people in 754 households.

In 2019, the district was separated from the county in the establishment of Khanmirza County, and the rural district was transferred to the new Central District.
