= Armand, Iran =

Village in Chaharmahal and Bakhtiari province, Iran

Armand Persian: ارمند
- Village
- Location within Iran
- Coordinates: 31°38′12″N 50°47′38″E
- Country: Iran
- Province: Chaharmahal and Bakhtiari
- County: Khanmirza
- District: Armand
- Rural District: Armand

Population (2016)
  - Total: 2,070
- Time zone: UTC+3:30 (IRST)

Armand (Persian: ارمند) (Note: Formerly Armand-e Olya (ارمند عليا), also romanized as Armand Olya and Armand-e ‘Olyā; also known as Armān and Ārmand-e Bālā) is a village in Armand Rural District of Armand District in Khanmirza County, Chaharmahal and Bakhtiari province, Iran, serving as capital of both the district and the rural district. The previous capital of the rural district was the village of Tang Kolureh.

== Demographics ==
=== Population ===
At the time of the 2006 National Census, the village's population was 1,730 in 392 households, when it was in the Central District of Lordegan County. The following census in 2011 counted 1,956 people in 486 households. The 2016 census measured the population of the village as 2,070 people in 563 households.

In 2019, the rural district was separated from the county in the establishment of Khanmirza County and transferred to the new Armand District.

== Climate ==
Climate data for Armand-e Olya(elevation: 1355m, 2000-2012 precipitation normals)
Month	Jan	Feb	Mar	Apr	May	Jun	Jul	Aug	Sep	Oct	Nov	Dec	Year
Average precipitation mm (inches)	115.5 (4.55)	97.0 (3.82)	66.4 (2.61)	67.0 (2.64)	9.3 (0.37)	0.0 (0.0)	0.2 (0.01)	0.0 (0.0)	3.7 (0.15)	14.6 (0.57)	108.1 (4.26)	141.3 (5.56)	623.1 (24.54)
Source: Chaharmahalmet
