= Jaghd =

Jaghd جغد
- Village
- Location within Iran
- Coordinates: 31°41′13″N 50°49′50″E
- Country: Iran
- Province: Chaharmahal and Bakhtiari
- County: Khanmirza
- Bakhsh: Armand
- Rural District: Armand

Population (2016)
  - Total: 156
- Time zone: UTC+3:30 (IRST)

Jaghd (Persian: جغد) is a village in Armand Rural District, in Armand District of Khanmirza County, Chaharmahal and Bakhtiari Province, Iran. At the 2016 census, its population was 156, in 39 families. People's from Bakhtiary and Behdarvand .

== Geography and natural science ==
This village is located in the central Zagros Mountains and oak forests. Downstream of the village passes the river Armand, which is one of the branches of Karun. The village is surrounded by mountains and has relatively cold winters and very hot summers. In spring, melting snow from Armand mountain creates a seasonal river downstream of the village which flows into the Armand river.

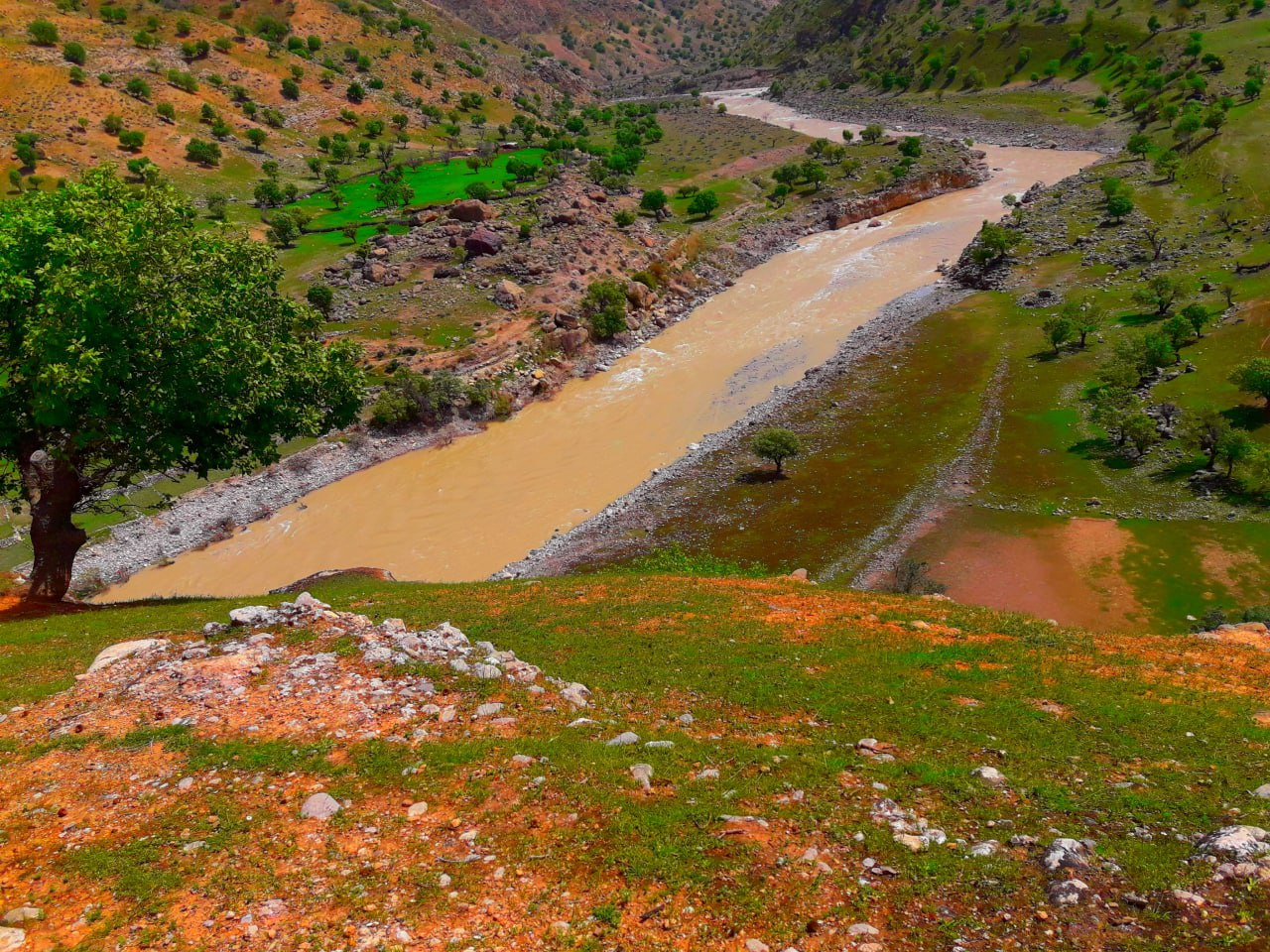
رودخانه ارمند

== Jobs and work of people ==
The people of this village used to be warriors, farmers and ranchers, but now most of them are farmers and ranchers. A number of rural families migrated to neighboring provinces for jobs such as road and urban contracting, Isogum, etc., and a number of talented rural youth went sightseeing, recreation, and boating. A number of people also illegally produce and sell charcoal from oak trees. Some also hunt for fun and keep alive the tradition of fishing (hunting and Chinese guns in the mountains and fishing in the river).

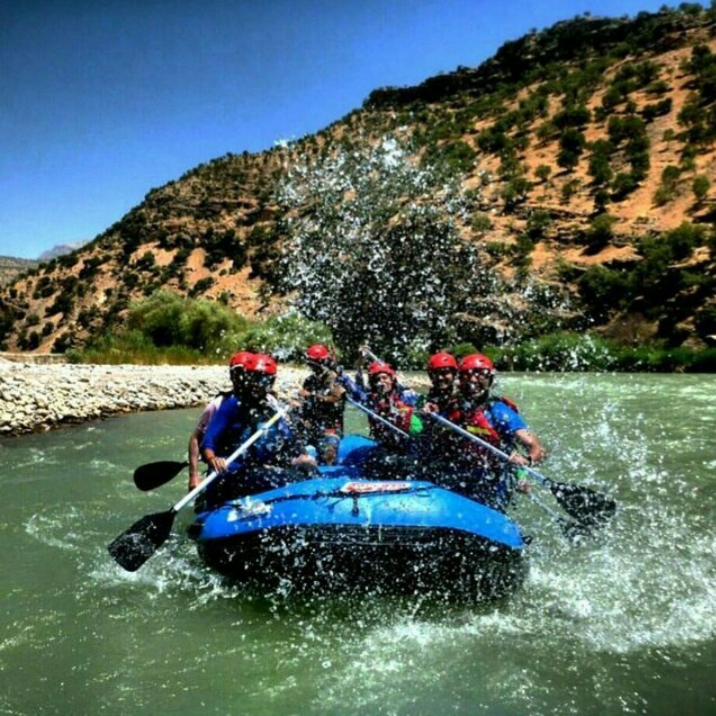
نمونه ای ازصنعت گردشگری روستای جغد

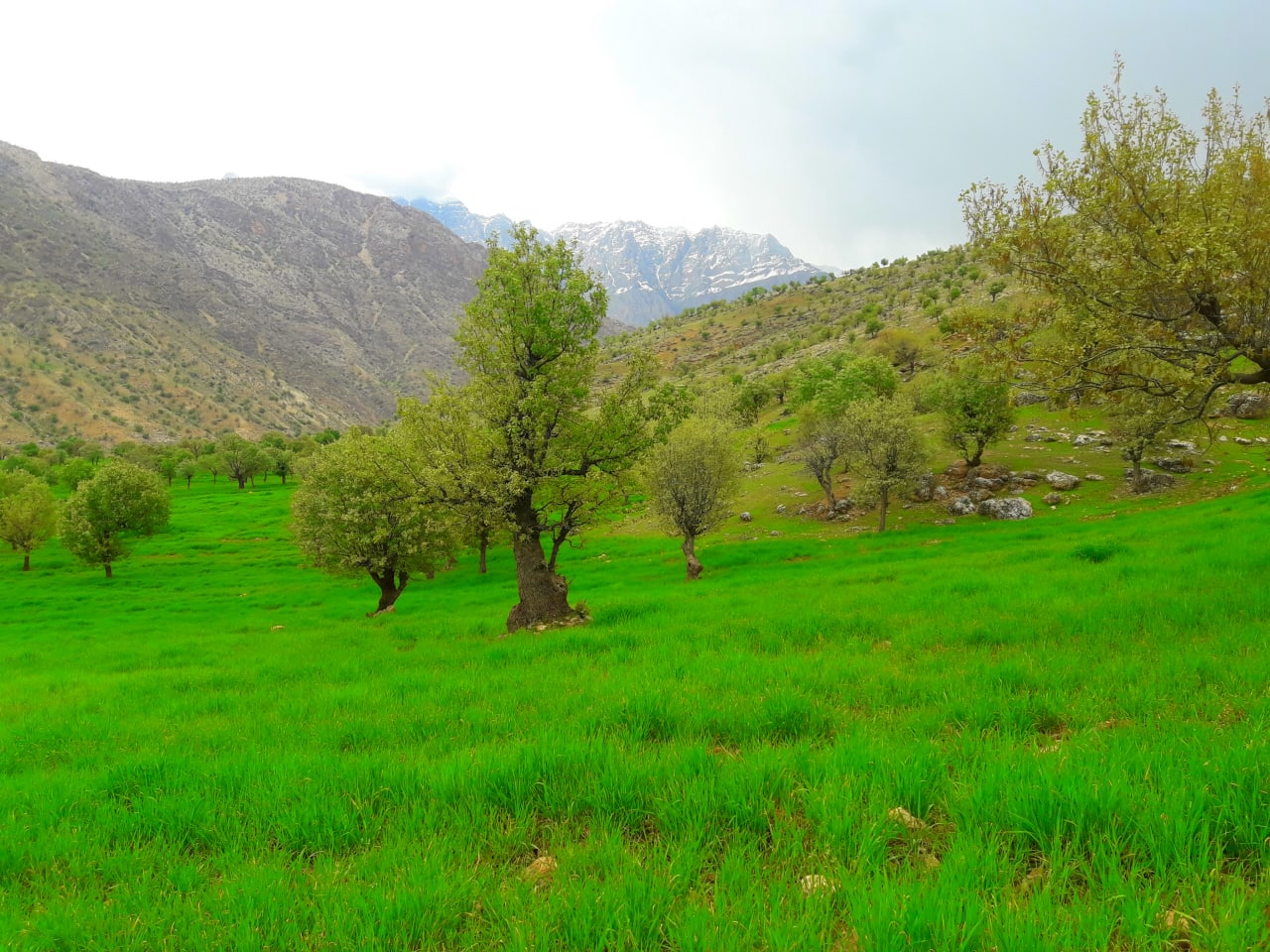
زمین های زراعی جغد

The people of this village are old and far from the nomads of Bakhtiari tribe and have been digging and living together for about 70 years. About 100 years ago, these people went to the owl plain, which has been known by this name since ancient times. They came or built a village. The people of this village are from Lor, Bakhtiari, Haft Lang, Bab Behdarvand and Janaki (Javanki) tribes. The people of this village have ethnic-tribal affiliation with the people of Jalil Janki cold tribe, Rigi Janki cold tribe, Armandi Janki cold tribe and other Khanmirza, Lordegan and Felard tribes. In the mountains of this village, many medicinal plants and roots grow and people treat many of their simple pains with traditional medicine. Herbs such as mountain tea, mountain celery, mountain mushroom, red root, shallot, FERULAGO CONTRACTA, thyme and many other medicinal plants not mentioned in this article.

Red flowers and chamomile flowers are well-known flowers of this village.

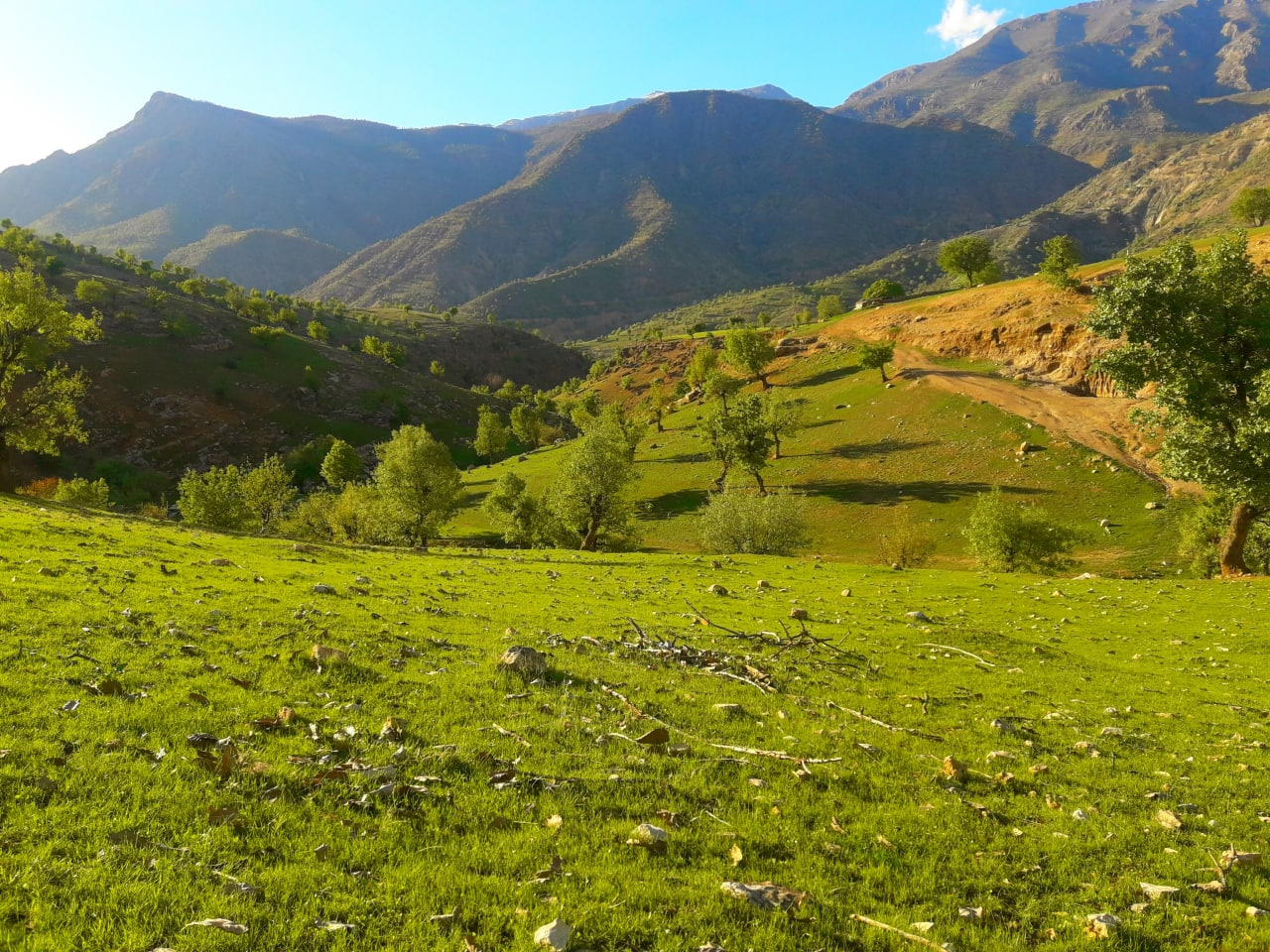
طبیعت سرسبز بهاری جغد

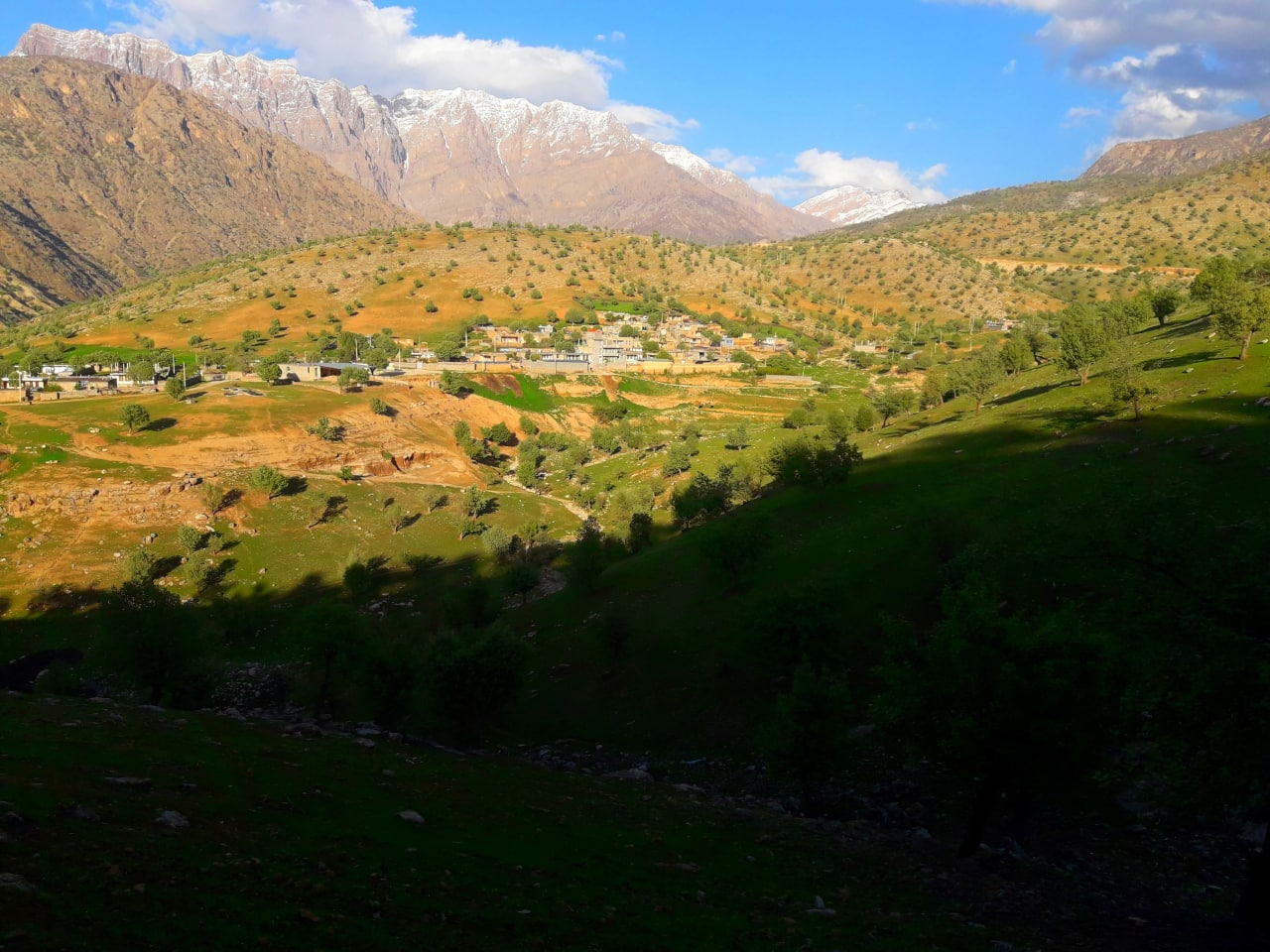
طبیعت زیبای روستای جغد
