= Sileh =

Village in Chaharmahal and Bakhtiari province, Iran

Sileh Persian: سيله
- Village
- Location within Iran
- Coordinates: 31°26′06″N 51°09′12″E
- Country: Iran
- Province: Chaharmahal and Bakhtiari
- County: Khanmirza
- District: Central
- Rural District: Javanmardi

Population (2016)
  - Total: 858
- Time zone: UTC+3:30 (IRST)

Sileh (Persian: سيله) (Note: Also romanized as Sīleh and Sīlāh) is a village in Javanmardi Rural District of the Central District in Khanmirza County, Chaharmahal and Bakhtiari province, Iran.

== Demographics ==
=== Ethnicity ===
The village is populated by Lurs.

=== Population ===
At the time of the 2006 National Census, the village's population was 764 in 155 households, when it was in the former Khanmirza District of Lordegan County. The following census in 2011 counted 931 people in 197 households. The 2016 census measured the population of the village as 858 people in 243 households.

In 2019, the district was separated from the county in the establishment of Khanmirza County, and the rural district was transferred to the new Central District.
