= Chah Gah, Khanmirza =

Village in Chaharmahal and Bakhtiari province, Iran

Chah Gah Persian: چاه گاه
- Village
- Location within Iran
- Coordinates: 31°34′05″N 50°55′50″E
- Country: Iran
- Province: Chaharmahal and Bakhtiari
- County: Khanmirza
- District: Armand
- Rural District: Armand

Population (2016)
  - Total: 1,058
- Time zone: UTC+3:30 (IRST)

Chah Gah (Persian: چاه گاه) is a village in Armand Rural District of Armand District in Khanmirza County, Chaharmahal and Bakhtiari province, Iran.

== Demographics ==
=== Population ===
At the time of the 2006 National Census, the village's population was 909 in 202 households, when it was in the Central District of Lordegan County. The following census in 2011 counted 935 people in 240 households. The 2016 census measured the population of the village as 1,058 people in 276 households.

In 2019, the rural district was separated from the county in the establishment of Khanmirza County and transferred to the new Armand District.
