= Chah Gah =

Chah Gah or Chah-i-Gah or Chah-e Gah or Chahgah (Persian: چاه گاه) may refer to:

- Chah Gah, Dashti, Bushehr province
- Chah Gah, Tangestan, Bushehr province
- Chah Gah, Khanmirza, Chaharmahal and Bakhtiari province
- Chahgah-e Milas, Chaharmahal and Bakhtiari province
- Chahgah, Sardasht, Chaharmahal and Bakhtiari province
- Chah-e Gah, Kohgiluyeh and Boyer-Ahmad
