= Shesh Bahreh =

Shesh Bahreh (Persian: شش بهره) may refer to:

- Shesh Bahreh-ye Mianeh
- Shesh Bahreh-ye Olya
- Shesh Bahreh-ye Sofla
