= Sepidar Rural District (Khanmirza County) =

Rural district in Chaharmahal and Bakhtiari province, Iran

Sepidar Rural District Persian: دهستان سپيدار
- Rural District
- Location within Iran
- Coordinates: 31°41′N 50°46′E
- Country: Iran
- Province: Chaharmahal and Bakhtiari
- County: Khanmirza
- District: Armand
- Established: 2019
- Capital: Shahrak-e Sunk
- Time zone: UTC+3:30 (IRST)

Sepidar Rural District (Persian: دهستان سپيدار) is in Armand District of Khanmirza County, Chaharmahal and Bakhtiari province, Iran. Its capital is the village of Shahrak-e Sunk, whose population at the time of the 2016 National Census was 1,602 people in 392 households.

== History ==
In 2019, Armand Rural District and Khanmirza District were separated from Lordegan County in the establishment of Khanmirza County, and Sepidar Rural District was created in the new Armand District.

== Other villages in the rural district ==
- Buger
- Mesen
- Sar Tang-e Mesen
