= Qalehchi =

Qalehchi (Persian: قلعه چي), also rendered as Qalachi, may refer to:

- Qalehchi, Chaharmahal and Bakhtiari
- Qalehchi-ye Bala, Markazi Province
- Qalehchi-ye Pain, Markazi Province
- Qalachi, alternate name of Kalleh-ye Nahr Mian, Markazi Province

== See also ==
- Qalehcheh (disambiguation)
