= Khanmirza =

Khanmirza (Persian: خانمیرزا) may refer to:

- Khanmirza County, formerly Khanmirza District
- Khanmirza Rural District
