= Deh Rashid =

Deh Rashid or Deh-e Rashid or Dehrashid (Persian: ده رشيد) may refer to:

- Deh Rashid, Chaharmahal and Bakhtiari
- Deh-e Rashid, Kurdistan
- Deh Rashid, Zabol, Sistan and Baluchestan Province
- Deh Rashid, Zehak, Sistan and Baluchestan Province
