= Shesh Bahreh-ye Sofla =

Village in Chaharmahal and Bakhtiari, Iran

Shesh Bahreh-ye Sofla شش بهره سفلي
- Village
- Location within Iran
- Coordinates: 31°30′28″N 50°47′24″E
- Country: Iran
- Province: Chaharmahal and Bakhtiari
- County: Lordegan
- Bakhsh: Central
- Rural District: Milas

Population (2006)
  - Total: 276
- Time zone: UTC+3:30 (IRST)
  - Summer (DST): UTC+4:30 (IRDT)

Shesh Bahreh-ye Sofla (Persian: شش بهره سفلي, also Romanized as Shesh Bahreh-ye Soflá and Shesh Bahreh Soflá; also known as Shesh Bahreh Pā’īn) is a village in Milas Rural District, in the Central District of Lordegan County, Chaharmahal and Bakhtiari Province, Iran. At the 2006 census, its population was 276, in 62 families.
