= Darreh Shur-e Mehdi =

Village in Chaharmahal and Bakhtiari, Iran

Darreh Shur-e Mehdi دره شورمهدي
- Village
- Country: Iran
- Province: Chaharmahal and Bakhtiari
- County: Lordegan
- Bakhsh: Central
- Rural District: Milas

Population (2006)
  - Total: 217
- Time zone: UTC+3:30 (IRST)
  - Summer (DST): UTC+4:30 (IRDT)

Darreh Shur-e Mehdi (Persian: دره شورمهدي, also romanized as Darreh Shūr-e Mehdī) is a village in Milas Rural District, in the Central District of Lordegan County, Chaharmahal and Bakhtiari Province, Iran. At the 2006 census, its population was 217, in 39 families. The village is populated by Lurs.
