= Chahgah-e Milas =

Chahgah-e Milas چاهگاه ميلاس
- Village
- Location within Iran
- Coordinates: 31°29′21″N 50°46′22″E
- Country: Iran
- Province: Chaharmahal and Bakhtiari
- County: Lordegan
- Bakhsh: Central
- Rural District: Milas

Population (2006)
  - Total: 471
- Time zone: UTC+3:30 (IRST)
  - Summer (DST): UTC+4:30 (IRDT)

Chahgah-e Milas (Persian: چاهگاه ميلاس, also Romanized as Chāhgāh-e Mīlās) is a village in Milas Rural District, in the Central District of Lordegan County, Chaharmahal and Bakhtiari Province, Iran. At the 2006 census, its population was 471, in 92 families.
