= Fajr-e Bar Aftab =

Village in Chaharmahal and Bakhtiari province, Iran

Fajr-e Bar Aftab Persian: فجر بر آفتاب
- Village
- Location within Iran
- Coordinates: 31°31′37″N 50°49′07″E
- Country: Iran
- Province: Chaharmahal and Bakhtiari
- County: Lordegan
- District: Central
- Rural District: Milas

Population (2016)
  - Total: 6,895
- Time zone: UTC+3:30 (IRST)

Fajr-e Bar Aftab (Persian: فجر بر آفتاب) (Note: Also romanized as Fajr-e Bar Āftāb; formerly known as Shahrak-e Baraftab-e Shirani (شهرك برافتاب شيراني), also romanized as Shahrak-e Barāftāb-e Shīrānī) is a village in Milas Rural District of the Central District in Lordegan County, Chaharmahal and Bakhtiari province, Iran.

== Demographics ==
=== Population ===
At the time of the 2006 National Census, the village's population, as Shahrak-e Baraftab-e Shirani, was 3,872 in 713 households. The following census in 2011 counted 5,723 people in 1,287 households. The 2016 census measured the population of the village as 6,895 people in 1,677 households, by which time its name had been changed to Fajr-e Bar Aftab. It was the most populous village in its rural district.
