= Tall Maran =

Village in Chaharmahal and Bakhtiari province, Iran

Tall Maran Persian: تل ماران
- Village
- Location within Iran
- Country: Iran
- Province: Chaharmahal and Bakhtiari
- County: Lordegan
- District: Central
- Rural District: Milas

Population (2016)
  - Total: 846
- Time zone: UTC+3:30 (IRST)

Tall Maran (Persian: تل ماران) (Note: Also romanized as Tall Mārān and Tol Mārān) is a village in Milas Rural District of the Central District in Lordegan County, Chaharmahal and Bakhtiari province, Iran.

== Population ==
At the time of the 2006 National Census, the village's population was 706 in 151 households. The following census in 2011 counted 794 people in 190 households. The 2016 census measured the population of the village as 846 people in 210 households.
