= Karf =

Karf (Persian: كرف) may refer to:

- Karf-e Olya
- Karf-e Sofla
