= Darreh Shur, Lordegan =

Village in Chaharmahal and Bakhtiari, Iran

Darreh Shur دره شور
- Village
- Location within Iran
- Coordinates: 31°32′10″N 50°42′54″E
- Country: Iran
- Province: Chaharmahal and Bakhtiari
- County: Lordegan
- Bakhsh: Central
- Rural District: Milas

Population (2006)
  - Total: 665
- Time zone: UTC+3:30 (IRST)
  - Summer (DST): UTC+4:30 (IRDT)

Darreh Shur (Persian: دره شور, also Romanized as Darreh Shūr) is a village in Milas Rural District, in the Central District of Lordegan County, Chaharmahal and Bakhtiari Province, Iran. At the 2006 census, its population was 665, in 122 families. The village is populated by Lurs.
