= Bagh Anar-e Milas =

Village in Chaharmahal and Bakhtiari province, Iran

Bagh Anar-e Milas Persian: باغ انارميلاس
- Village
- Location within Iran
- Coordinates: 31°28′54″N 50°45′56″E
- Country: Iran
- Province: Chaharmahal and Bakhtiari
- County: Lordegan
- District: Central
- Rural District: Milas

Population (2016)
  - Total: 3,132
- Time zone: UTC+3:30 (IRST)

Bagh Anar-e Milas (Persian: باغ انارميلاس) (Note: Also romanized as Bāgh Anār-e Mīlās) is a village in Milas Rural District of the Central District in Lordegan County, Chaharmahal and Bakhtiari province, Iran.

== Demographics ==
=== Ethnicity ===
The village is populated by Lurs.

=== Population ===
At the time of the 2006 National Census, the village's population was 2,258 in 442 households. The following census in 2011 counted 2,740 people in 696 households. The 2016 census measured the population of the village as 3,132 people in 864 households.
