= Naghan (disambiguation) =

Naghan is a city in Chaharmahal and Bakhtiari Province, Iran.

Naghan (Persian: ناغان) may also refer to:

- Naghan-e Olya, Chaharmahal and Bakhtiari Province
- Naghan-e Sofla, Chaharmahal and Bakhtiari Province
- Naghan District, in Chaharmahal and Bakhtiari Province
- Naghan Rural District, in Chaharmahal and Bakhtiari Province
