= Deh Now-e Milas-e Sofla =

Village in Chaharmahal and Bakhtiari province, Iran

Deh Now-e Milas-e Sofla Persian: دهنو ميلاس سفلي
- Village
- Location within Iran
- Coordinates: 31°28′42″N 50°48′00″E
- Country: Iran
- Province: Chaharmahal and Bakhtiari
- County: Lordegan
- District: Central
- Rural District: Milas

Population (2016)
  - Total: 4,131
- Time zone: UTC+3:30 (IRST)

Deh Now-e Milas-e Sofla (Persian: دهنوميلاس) (Note: Also romanized as Deh Now-e Mīlās Soflá; formerly known as Deh Now-e Milas, also romanized as Deh Now-e Mīlās and Deh Now-ye Mīlās) is a village in Milas Rural District of the Central District in Lordegan County, Chaharmahal and Bakhtiari province, Iran.

== Population ==
At the time of the 2006 National Census, the village's population, as Deh Now-e Milas, was 3,331 in 610 households. The following census in 2011 counted 3,475 people in 767 households, by which time its name had been changed to Deh Now-e Milas-e Sofla. The 2016 census measured the population of the village as 4,131 people in 1,008 households.
