= Karf-e Sofla =

Karf-e Sofla كرف سفلي
- Village
- Location within Iran
- Coordinates: 31°31′44″N 50°42′27″E
- Country: Iran
- Province: Chaharmahal and Bakhtiari
- County: Lordegan
- Bakhsh: Central
- Rural District: Milas

Population (2006)
  - Total: 126
- Time zone: UTC+3:30 (IRST)
  - Summer (DST): UTC+4:30 (IRDT)

Karf-e Sofla (Persian: كرف سفلي, also Romanized as Karf-e Soflá) is a village in Milas Rural District, in the Central District of Lordegan County, Chaharmahal and Bakhtiari Province, Iran. At the 2006 census, its population was 126, in 28 families. The village is populated by Lurs.
