= Darreh Shur-e Khong =

Village in Chaharmahal and Bakhtiari, Iran

Darreh Shur-e Khong دره شورخنگ
- Village
- Location within Iran
- Coordinates: 31°32′09″N 50°42′25″E
- Country: Iran
- Province: Chaharmahal and Bakhtiari
- County: Lordegan
- Bakhsh: Central
- Rural District: Milas

Population (2006)
  - Total: 367
- Time zone: UTC+3:30 (IRST)
  - Summer (DST): UTC+4:30 (IRDT)

Darreh Shur-e Khong (Persian: دره شورخنگ, also Romanized as Darreh Shūr-e Khong; also known as Darrehshūr-e Khong) is a village in Milas Rural District, in the Central District of Lordegan County, Chaharmahal and Bakhtiari Province, Iran. At the 2006 census, its population was 367, in 71 families. The village is populated by Lurs.
