= Bar Aftab-e Milas =

Village in Chaharmahal and Bakhtiari province, Iran

Bar Aftab-e Milas Persian: برافتاب ميلاس
- Village
- Location within Iran
- Coordinates: 31°29′50″N 50°47′10″E
- Country: Iran
- Province: Chaharmahal and Bakhtiari
- County: Lordegan
- District: Central
- Rural District: Milas

Population (2016)
  - Total: 1,223
- Time zone: UTC+3:30 (IRST)

Bar Aftab-e Milas (Persian: برافتاب ميلاس) (Note: Also romanized as Bar Āftāb-e Mīlās, Bar Aftāb Mīlās, and Bar Aftāb-e Mīlās) is a village in Milas Rural District of the Central District in Lordegan County, Chaharmahal and Bakhtiari province, Iran.

== Population ==
At the time of the 2006 National Census, the village's population was 885 in 159 households. The following census in 2011 counted 1,043 people in 246 households. The 2016 census measured the population of the village as 1,223 people in 325 households.
