= Darjuneh =

Village in Chaharmahal and Bakhtiari province, Iran

Darjuneh Persian: دارجونه
- Village
- Location within Iran
- Coordinates: 31°31′05″N 50°47′08″E
- Country: Iran
- Province: Chaharmahal and Bakhtiari
- County: Lordegan
- District: Central
- Rural District: Milas

Population (2016)
  - Total: 976
- Time zone: UTC+3:30 (IRST)

Darjuneh (Persian: دارجونه) (Note: Also romanized as Dārjūneh) is a village in Milas Rural District of the Central District in Lordegan County, Chaharmahal and Bakhtiari province, Iran.

== Population ==
At the time of the 2006 National Census, the village's population was 667 in 117 households. The following census in 2011 counted 913 people in 208 households. The 2016 census measured the population of the village as 976 people in 264 households.
