= Gusheh, Lordegan =

Village in Chaharmahal and Bakhtiari province, Iran

Gusheh Persian: گوشه
- Village
- Location within Iran
- Coordinates: 31°30′46″N 50°43′59″E
- Country: Iran
- Province: Chaharmahal and Bakhtiari
- County: Lordegan
- District: Central
- Rural District: Milas

Population (2016)
  - Total: 1,211
- Time zone: UTC+3:30 (IRST)

Gusheh (Persian: گوشه) (Note: Also romanized as Gūsheh) is a village in, and the capital of, Milas Rural District in the Central District of Lordegan County, Chaharmahal and Bakhtiari province, Iran.

== Demographics ==
=== Ethnicity ===
The village is populated by Lurs.

=== Population ===
At the time of the 2006 National Census, the village's population was 1,166 in 227 households. The following census in 2011 counted 1,027 people in 218 households. The 2016 census measured the population of the village as 1,211 people in 298 households. It was the most populous village in its rural district.
