= Naghan-e Olya =

Naghan-e Olya ناغان عليا
- Village
- Location within Iran
- Coordinates: 31°31′07″N 50°46′21″E
- Country: Iran
- Province: Chaharmahal and Bakhtiari
- County: Lordegan
- Bakhsh: Central
- Rural District: Milas

Population (2006)
  - Total: 431
- Time zone: UTC+3:30 (IRST)
  - Summer (DST): UTC+4:30 (IRDT)

Naghan-e Olya (Persian: ناغان عليا, also Romanized as Nāghān-e ‘Olyā) is a village in Milas Rural District, in the Central District of Lordegan County, Chaharmahal and Bakhtiari Province, Iran. At the 2006 census, its population was 431, in 71 families. The village is populated by Lurs.
