= Deh Chenar, Chaharmahal and Bakhtiari =

Deh Chenar ده چنار
- Village
- Location within Iran
- Coordinates: 31°25′22″N 51°08′29″E
- Country: Iran
- Province: Chaharmahal and Bakhtiari
- County: Lordegan
- Bakhsh: Central
- Rural District: Milas

Population (2006)
  - Total: 321
- Time zone: UTC+3:30 (IRST)
  - Summer (DST): UTC+4:30 (IRDT)

Deh Chenar (Persian: ده چنار, also Romanized as Deh Chenār) is a village in Milas Rural District, in the Central District of Lordegan County, Chaharmahal and Bakhtiari Province, Iran. At the 2006 census, its population was 321, in 54 families. The village is populated by Lurs.
