= Milas, Iran =

Village in Chaharmahal and Bakhtiari province, Iran

Milas Persian: ميلاس
- Village
- Location within Iran
- Coordinates: 31°28′16″N 50°46′57″E
- Country: Iran
- Province: Chaharmahal and Bakhtiari
- County: Lordegan
- District: Central
- Rural District: Milas

Population (2016)
  - Total: 824
- Time zone: UTC+3:30 (IRST)

Milas (Persian: ميلاس) (Note: Also romanized as Mīlās) is a village in Milas Rural District of the Central District in Lordegan County, Chaharmahal and Bakhtiari province, Iran.

== Population ==
At the time of the 2006 National Census, the village's population was 799 in 165 households. The following census in 2011 counted 861 people in 206 households. The 2016 census measured the population of the village as 824 people in 221 households.
