= Mesin =

Mesin may refer to:

- Měšín, Czech Republic
- Mesin, Iran
