= Shesh Bahreh-ye Mianeh =

Village in Chaharmahal and Bakhtiari province, Iran

Shesh Bahreh-ye Mianeh Persian: شش بهره ميانه
- Village
- Location within Iran
- Coordinates: 31°30′04″N 50°48′24″E
- Country: Iran
- Province: Chaharmahal and Bakhtiari
- County: Lordegan
- District: Central
- Rural District: Milas

Population (2016)
  - Total: 1,302
- Time zone: UTC+3:30 (IRST)

Shesh Bahreh-ye Mianeh (Persian: شش بهره ميانه) (Note: Also romanized as Shesh Bahreh-ye Mīāneh; also known as Shesh Bahreh-ye Aḩmadī) is a village in Milas Rural District of the Central District in Lordegan County, Chaharmahal and Bakhtiari province, Iran.

== Population ==
At the time of the 2006 National Census, the village's population was 1,120 in 198 households. The following census in 2011 counted 1,070 people in 243 households. The 2016 census measured the population of the village as 1,302 people in 346 households.
