= Naghan-e Sofla =

Village in Chaharmahal and Bakhtiari province, Iran

Naghan-e Sofla Persian: ناغان سفلي
- Village
- Location within Iran
- Coordinates: 31°31′29″N 50°45′20″E
- Country: Iran
- Province: Chaharmahal and Bakhtiari
- County: Lordegan
- District: Central
- Rural District: Milas

Population (2016)
  - Total: 1,792
- Time zone: UTC+3:30 (IRST)

Naghan-e Sofla (Persian: ناغان سفلي) (Note: Also romanized as Nāghān-e Soflá; also known as Nāghūn Pā’īn and Nāghūn-e Pā’īn) is a village in Milas Rural District of the Central District in Lordegan County, Chaharmahal and Bakhtiari province, Iran.

== Demographics ==
=== Ethnicity ===
The village is populated by Lurs.

=== Population ===
At the time of the 2006 National Census, the village's population was 1,486 in 285 households. The following census in 2011 counted 1,794 people in 400 households. The 2016 census measured the population of the village as 1,792 people in 478 households.
