= Qalehcheh, Lordegan =

Qalehcheh قلعه چه
- Village
- Location within Iran
- Coordinates: 31°30′55″N 50°45′36″E
- Country: Iran
- Province: Chaharmahal and Bakhtiari
- County: Lordegan
- Bakhsh: Central
- Rural District: Milas

Population (2006)
  - Total: 155
- Time zone: UTC+3:30 (IRST)
  - Summer (DST): UTC+4:30 (IRDT)

Qalehcheh (Persian: قلعه چه, also Romanized as Qal‘ehcheh; also known as Qal‘ehchī) is a village in Milas Rural District, in the Central District of Lordegan County, Chaharmahal and Bakhtiari Province, Iran. At the 2006 census, its population was 155, in 27 families. The village is populated by Lurs.
