= Deh-e Torkan =

Deh-e Torkan or Deh Torkan (Persian: ده تركان) may refer to:

- Deh-e Torkan, Chaharmahal and Bakhtiari
- Deh Torkan, Kerman
- Deh-e Torkan, Lorestan
