= Karf-e Olya =

Village in Chaharmahal and Bakhtiari province, Iran

Karf-e Olya Persian: كرف عليا
- Village
- Location within Iran
- Coordinates: 31°31′11″N 50°42′42″E
- Country: Iran
- Province: Chaharmahal and Bakhtiari
- County: Lordegan
- District: Central
- Rural District: Milas

Population (2016)
  - Total: 1,198
- Time zone: UTC+3:30 (IRST)

Karf-e Olya (Persian: كرف عليا) (Note: Also romanized as Karf-e ‘Olyā; also known as Karaf Bālā and Karf-e Bālā) is a village in Milas Rural District of the Central District in Lordegan County, Chaharmahal and Bakhtiari province, Iran.

== Demographics ==
=== Ethnicity ===
The village is populated by Lurs.

=== Population ===
At the time of the 2006 National Census, the village's population was 1,291 in 222 households. The following census in 2011 counted 1,209 people in 270 households. The 2016 census measured the population of the village as 1,198 people in 350 households.
