= Shesh Bahreh-ye Olya =

Village in Chaharmahal and Bakhtiari province, Iran

Shesh Bahreh-ye Olya Persian: شش بهره عليا
- Village
- Location within Iran
- Coordinates: 31°30′00″N 50°48′20″E
- Country: Iran
- Province: Chaharmahal and Bakhtiari
- County: Lordegan
- District: Central
- Rural District: Milas

Population (2016)
  - Total: 1,435
- Time zone: UTC+3:30 (IRST)

Shesh Bahreh-ye Olya (Persian: شش بهره عليا) (Note: Also romanized as Shesh Bahreh ‘Olyā and Shesh-ye Bahreh ‘Olyā; also known as Shesh Bahreh Bālā and Shesh Bahreh-ye Bālā) is a village in Milas Rural District of the Central District in Lordegan County, Chaharmahal and Bakhtiari province, Iran.

== Population ==
At the time of the 2006 National Census, the village's population was 1,077 in 184 households. The following census in 2011 counted 1,285 people in 308 households. The 2016 census measured the population of the village as 1,435 people in 346 households.
