= Silah =

Silah may refer to:

- Michael J. Silah, American admiral, director of the U.S. National Oceanic and Atmospheric Administration Commissioned Officer Corps
- Sileh, a village in Iran
