= Chahgah, Sardasht =

Chahgah چاهگاه
- Village
- Location in Iran
- Coordinates: 31°21′31″N 50°46′59″E
- Country: Iran
- Province: Chaharmahal and Bakhtiari
- County: Lordegan
- Bakhsh: Central
- Rural District: Sardasht

Population (2006)
  - Total: 25
- Time zone: UTC+3:30 (IRST)
  - Summer (DST): UTC+4:30 (IRDT)

Chahgah (Persian: چاهگاه, also Romanized as Chāhgāh) is a village in Sardasht Rural District, in the Central District of Lordegan County, Chaharmahal and Bakhtiari Province, Iran. At the 2006 census, its population was 25, in 5 families.
