= Emamabad, Falard =

Emamabad امام اباد
- Village
- Location within Iran
- Coordinates: 31°14′48″N 51°08′23″E
- Country: Iran
- Province: Chaharmahal and Bakhtiari
- County: Lordegan
- Bakhsh: Falard
- Rural District: Poshtkuh

Population (2006)
  - Total: 315
- Time zone: UTC+3:30 (IRST)
  - Summer (DST): UTC+4:30 (IRDT)

Emamabad (Persian: امام اباد, also Romanized as Emāmābād) is a village in Poshtkuh Rural District, Falard District, Lordegan County, Chaharmahal and Bakhtiari Province, Iran. At the 2006 census, its population was 315, in 66 families. The village is populated by Lurs.
