= Lordegan =

City in Chaharmahal and Bakhtiari province, Iran

Lordegan لردگان
- City
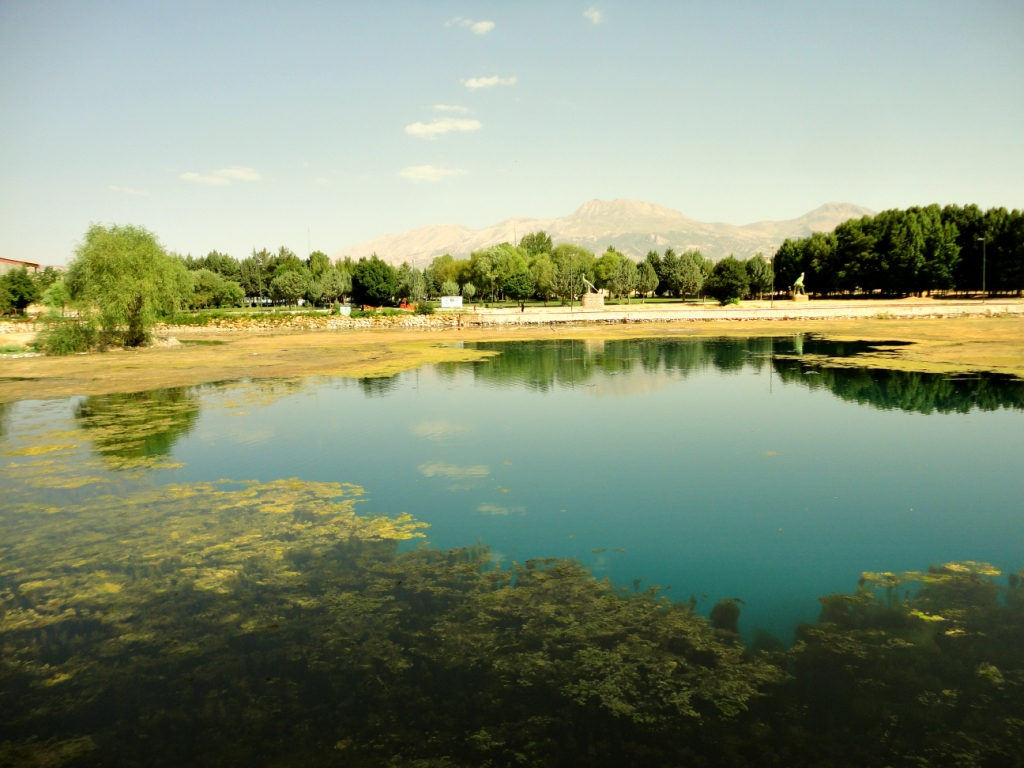
- Cheshmeh-ye Beram

- Location within Iran
- Coordinates: 31°30′34″N 50°50′04″E
- Country: Iran
- Province: Chaharmahal and Bakhtiari
- County: Lordegan
- District: Central
- Elevation: 1,764 m (5,787 ft)

Population (2016)
  - Total: 40,528
- Time zone: UTC+3:30 (IRST)

Lordegan (Persian and Luri: لردگان) (Note: Also romanized as Lordagān, Lordegān, and Lordgān; also known as Lordajān, Lordakān, and Lurdagān) is a city in the Central District of Lordegan County, Chaharmahal and Bakhtiari province, Iran, serving as capital of both the county and the district.

== Demographics ==
=== Ethnicity ===
The city is populated by Lurs.

=== Population ===
At the time of the 2006 National Census, the city's population was 22,728 in 4,459 households. The following census in 2011 counted 35,276 people in 8,037 households. The 2016 census measured the population of the city as 40,528 people in 10,482 households.

== Civilian casualties of 2025-2026 Iranian protests in Lordegan ==
Beginning on 28 December 2025, mass demonstrations erupted across multiple cities in Iran amid a deepening economic crisis and widespread dissatisfaction with the government. While initially sparked by frustration over skyrocketing inflation, rising food prices, and the severe depreciation of the Iranian rial, the protests quickly evolved into a broader movement demanding an end to the Islamic Republic's rule.

Hengaw Organization of Human Rights reported the killings of Ahmad Jalil, 21, and Sajjad Valamanesh, 28, both Lors from Lordegan. According to information received by the Hengaw Organization for Human Rights, Jalil and Valamanesh were shot with live ammunition by government forces during public protests on Thursday, 1 January 2026, and later died from their injuries.

== Climate ==
Climate data for Lordegan (1995–2010 normals)
| Month | Jan | Feb | Mar | Apr | May | Jun | Jul | Aug | Sep | Oct | Nov | Dec | Year |
|---|---|---|---|---|---|---|---|---|---|---|---|---|---|
| Mean daily maximum °C (°F) | 9.4 (48.9) | 12.7 (54.9) | 17.0 (62.6) | 21.9 (71.4) | 28.3 (82.9) | 34.3 (93.7) | 37.0 (98.6) | 36.8 (98.2) | 32.7 (90.9) | 26.6 (79.9) | 18.2 (64.8) | 12.4 (54.3) | 23.9 (75.1) |
| Daily mean °C (°F) | 3.2 (37.8) | 6.0 (42.8) | 9.6 (49.3) | 14.1 (57.4) | 19.1 (66.4) | 24.2 (75.6) | 27.5 (81.5) | 27.1 (80.8) | 22.7 (72.9) | 17.3 (63.1) | 10.3 (50.5) | 5.7 (42.3) | 15.6 (60.0) |
| Mean daily minimum °C (°F) | −2.9 (26.8) | −0.8 (30.6) | 2.2 (36.0) | 6.2 (43.2) | 9.9 (49.8) | 14.2 (57.6) | 18.0 (64.4) | 17.5 (63.5) | 12.6 (54.7) | 8.0 (46.4) | 2.5 (36.5) | −1.0 (30.2) | 7.2 (45.0) |
| Average precipitation mm (inches) | 127.1 (5.00) | 86.5 (3.41) | 86.1 (3.39) | 64.1 (2.52) | 8.1 (0.32) | 0.5 (0.02) | 1.0 (0.04) | 0.3 (0.01) | 1.2 (0.05) | 5.7 (0.22) | 51.6 (2.03) | 122.8 (4.83) | 555 (21.84) |
| Average relative humidity (%) | 66 | 57 | 50 | 49 | 35 | 25 | 24 | 23 | 26 | 33 | 51 | 63 | 42 |
| Average dew point °C (°F) | −3.3 (26.1) | −3.4 (25.9) | −1.2 (29.8) | 2.3 (36.1) | 3.0 (37.4) | 3.5 (38.3) | 5.9 (42.6) | 4.6 (40.3) | 1.8 (35.2) | 0.2 (32.4) | −0.8 (30.6) | −1.5 (29.3) | 0.9 (33.7) |
| Mean monthly sunshine hours | 194.9 | 202.2 | 235.2 | 244.5 | 316 | 351.8 | 343.3 | 342.9 | 320.5 | 290.4 | 226.5 | 201.4 | 3,269.6 |
Source: IRIMO (Dew Point 1995–2005)
