= Deh Chenar-e Dalvara =

Deh Chenar-e Dalvara ده چناردالورا
- Village
- Location within Iran
- Coordinates: 31°19′36″N 51°10′33″E
- Country: Iran
- Province: Chaharmahal and Bakhtiari
- County: Lordegan
- Bakhsh: Falard
- Rural District: Falard

Population (2006)
  - Total: 505
- Time zone: UTC+3:30 (IRST)
  - Summer (DST): UTC+4:30 (IRDT)

Deh Chenar-e Dalvara (Persian: ده چناردالورا, also Romanized as Deh Chenār-e Dālvarā; also known as Deh Chenār and Deh Chenār-e Dālvarād) is a village in Falard Rural District, Falard District, Lordegan County, Chaharmahal and Bakhtiari Province, Iran. At the 2006 census, its population was 505, in 94 families. The village is populated by Lurs.
