= Qaleh Cheh, Kerman =

Qaleh Cheh قلعه چه
- Village
- Location within Iran
- Coordinates: 29°23′00″N 57°27′00″E
- Country: Iran
- Province: Kerman
- County: Kerman
- Bakhsh: Rayen
- Rural District: Hoseynabad-e Goruh

Population (2006)
  - Total: 53
- Time zone: UTC+3:30 (IRST)
  - Summer (DST): UTC+4:30 (IRDT)

Qaleh Cheh (Persian: قلعه چه, also Romanized as Qal‘eh Cheh) is a village in Hoseynabad-e Goruh Rural District, Rayen District, Kerman County, Kerman Province, Iran. According to the 2006 census, its population was 53, residing in 12 families.
