= Qalehchi-ye Bala =

Qalehchi-ye Bala قلعه چي بالا
- Village
- Location within Iran
- Coordinates: 33°57′30″N 49°07′21″E
- Country: Iran
- Province: Markazi
- County: Shazand
- Bakhsh: Zalian
- Rural District: Nahr-e Mian

Population (2006)
  - Total: 478
- Time zone: UTC+3:30 (IRST)
  - Summer (DST): UTC+4:30 (IRDT)

Qalehchi-ye Bala (Persian: قلعه چي بالا, also Romanized as Qal‘ehchī-ye Bālā; also known as Qalāchī-ye ‘Olyā and Qal‘ehchī-ye ‘Olyā) is a village in Nahr-e Mian Rural District, Zalian District, Shazand County, Markazi Province, Iran. At the 2006 census, its population was 478, in 121 families.
