= Aluni =

City in Chaharmahal and Bakhtiari province, Iran

Aluni Persian: آلونی
- City
- Location within Iran
- Coordinates: 31°33′09″N 51°03′32″E
- Country: Iran
- Province: Chaharmahal and Bakhtiari
- County: Khanmirza
- District: Central

Population (2016)
  - Total: 2,775
- Time zone: UTC+3:30 (IRST)

Aluni (Persian: آلونی) (Note: Also romanized as Ālūnī) is a city in the Central District of Khanmirza County, Chaharmahal and Bakhtiari province, Iran, serving as capital of both the district and the county. It was the administrative center for Khanmirza Rural District until its capital was transferred to the village of Do Makan.

== Demographics ==
=== Ethnicity ===
The city is populated by Lurs.

=== Population ===
At the time of the 2006 National Census, the city's population was 2,297 in 481 households, when it was capital of the former Khanmirza District in Lordegan County. The following census in 2011 counted 2,639 people in 625 households. The 2016 census measured the population of the city as 2,775 people in 734 households.

In 2019, the district was separated from the county in the establishment of Khanmirza County, and Aluni was transferred to the new Central District as the county's capital.

== Climate ==
Climate data for Aluni (elevation: 1867m, 1996-2012 precipitation normals)
Month	Jan	Feb	Mar	Apr	May	Jun	Jul	Aug	Sep	Oct	Nov	Dec	Year
Average precipitation mm (inches)	108.5 (4.27)	84.2 (3.31)	84.9 (3.34)	49.0 (1.93)	5.8 (0.23)	0.1 (0.00)	0.1 (0.00)	0.4 (0.02)	1.2 (0.05)	5.3 (0.21)	57.2 (2.25)	106.9 (4.21)	503.6 (19.82)
Source: Chaharmahalmet
