= Deh Chenar, Kerman =

Deh Chenar ده چنار
- Village
- Location within Iran
- Coordinates: 30°50′17″N 56°31′51″E
- Country: Iran
- Province: Kerman
- County: Zarand
- Bakhsh: Central
- Rural District: Mohammadabad

Population (2006)
  - Total: 976
- Time zone: UTC+3:30 (IRST)
  - Summer (DST): UTC+4:30 (IRDT)

Deh Chenar (Persian: ده چنار, also Romanized as Deh Chenār) is a village in Mohammadabad Rural District, in the Central District of Zarand County, Kerman Province, Iran. According to the 2006 census, its population was 976, in 231 families.
