= Darreh Shur-e Bala =

Darreh Shur-e Bala دره شوربالا
- Village
- Location within Iran
- Coordinates: 29°59′23″N 51°55′21″E
- Country: Iran
- Province: Fars
- County: Mamasani
- Bakhsh: Doshman Ziari
- Rural District: Mashayekh

Population (2006)
  - Total: 46
- Time zone: UTC+3:30 (IRST)
  - Summer (DST): UTC+4:30 (IRDT)

Darreh Shur-e Bala (Persian: دره شوربالا, also Romanized as Darreh Shūr-e Bālā; also known as Darreh Shūr and Darreh Shūr-e 'Olyā) is a village in Mashayekh Rural District, Doshman Ziari District, Mamasani County, Fars province, Iran. At the 2006 census, its population was 46, in 15 families.
