= Khanabad, Dorud =

Khanabad خان آباد
- Village
- Location within Iran
- Coordinates: 33°26′51″N 49°11′46″E
- Country: Iran
- Province: Lorestan
- County: Dorud
- Bakhsh: Central
- Rural District: Heshmatabad

Population (2006)
  - Total: 367
- Time zone: UTC+3:30 (IRST)
  - Summer (DST): UTC+4:30 (IRDT)

Khanabad (Persian: خان آباد, also Romanized as Khānābād; also known as Khānābād-e Sar Āsīāb and Emamabad (Persian: امام آباد), also Romanized as Emāmābād) is a village in Heshmatabad Rural District, in the Central District of Dorud County, Lorestan Province, Iran. At the 2006 census, its population was 367, in 79 families.
