= Deh-e Rashid, Kurdistan =

Deh-e Rashid ده رشيد
- Village
- Location within Iran
- Coordinates: 35°19′44″N 47°24′55″E
- Country: Iran
- Province: Kurdistan
- County: Dehgolan
- Bakhsh: Central
- Rural District: Howmeh-ye Dehgolan

Population (2006)
  - Total: 247
- Time zone: UTC+3:30 (IRST)
  - Summer (DST): UTC+4:30 (IRDT)

Deh-e Rashid (Persian: ده رشيد, also Romanized as Deh-e Rashīd and Dehrashīd; also known as Deh-i-Rashi and Deh Rashī) is a village in Howmeh-ye Dehgolan Rural District, in the Central District of Dehgolan County, Kurdistan Province, Iran. At the 2006 census, its population was 247, in 57 families. The village is populated by Kurds.
