= Darreh Shur, Ardal =

Darreh Shur دره شور
- Village
- Location within Iran
- Coordinates: 32°06′00″N 50°31′00″E
- Country: Iran
- Province: Chaharmahal and Bakhtiari
- County: Ardal
- Bakhsh: Central
- Rural District: Poshtkuh

Population (2006)
  - Total: 33
- Time zone: UTC+3:30 (IRST)
  - Summer (DST): UTC+4:30 (IRDT)

Darreh Shur (Persian: دره شور, also Romanized as Darreh Shūr) is a village in Poshtkuh Rural District, in the Central District of Ardal County, Chaharmahal and Bakhtiari Province, Iran. At the 2006 census, its population was 33, in 6 families. The village is populated by Lurs.
