= Emamabad, Bushehr =

Emamabad امام اباد
- Village
- Location within Iran
- Coordinates: 28°27′34″N 51°31′53″E
- Country: Iran
- Province: Bushehr
- County: Dashti
- Bakhsh: Kaki
- Rural District: Cheghapur

Population (2006)
  - Total: 214
- Time zone: UTC+3:30 (IRST)
  - Summer (DST): UTC+4:30 (IRDT)

Emamabad (Persian: امام اباد) (Note: Also romanized as Emāmābād; formerly known as Damnalu (دمنالو)) is a village in Cheghapur Rural District, Kaki District, Dashti County, Bushehr Province, Iran. At the 2006 census, its population was 214, in 40 families.
