= Darreh Shur, Khuzestan =

Village in Khuzestan, Iran

Darreh Shur دره شور
- Village
- Location within Iran
- Coordinates: 31°28′12″N 49°54′10″E
- Country: Iran
- Province: Khuzestan
- County: Bagh-e Malek
- Bakhsh: Central
- Rural District: Haparu

Population (2006)
  - Total: 195
- Time zone: UTC+3:30 (IRST)
  - Summer (DST): UTC+4:30 (IRDT)

Darreh Shur (Persian: دره شور, also Romanized as Darreh Shūr; also known as Shahīd Sheykhī-ye Darreh Shūr) is a village in Haparu Rural District, in the Central District of Bagh-e Malek County, Khuzestan Province, Iran. At the 2006 census, its population was 195, in 34 families.
