= Darreh Shur, Kerman =

Darreh Shur دره شور
- Village
- Location within Iran
- Coordinates: 28°02′31″N 57°15′19″E
- Country: Iran
- Province: Kerman
- County: Faryab
- Bakhsh: Central
- Rural District: Golashkerd

Population (2006)
  - Total: 427
- Time zone: UTC+3:30 (IRST)
  - Summer (DST): UTC+4:30 (IRDT)

Darreh Shur (Persian: دره شور, also Romanized as Darreh Shūr and Darreh-ye Shūr; also known as Darrashar and Darreh Shar) is a village in Golashkerd Rural District, in the Central District of Faryab County, Kerman Province, Iran. At the 2006 census, its population was 427, in 108 families.
