= Qalehcheh-ye Muzarm =

Qalehcheh-ye Muzarm قلعچه موزرم
- Village
- Location within Iran
- Coordinates: 31°43′25″N 50°17′24″E
- Country: Iran
- Province: Khuzestan
- County: Izeh
- Bakhsh: Dehdez
- Rural District: Dehdez

Population (2006)
  - Total: 89
- Time zone: UTC+3:30 (IRST)
  - Summer (DST): UTC+4:30 (IRDT)

Qalehcheh-ye Muzarm (Persian: قلعچه موزرم, also Romanized as Qal‘ehcheh-ye Mūzarm) is a village in Dehdez Rural District, Dehdez District, Izeh County, Khuzestan Province, Iran. At the 2006 census, its population was 89, in 17 families.
