= Darreh Shur, Miankuh =

Darreh Shur دره شور
- Village
- Location within Iran
- Coordinates: 31°40′25″N 50°30′06″E
- Country: Iran
- Province: Chaharmahal and Bakhtiari
- County: Ardal
- Bakhsh: Miankuh
- Rural District: Shalil

Population (2006)
  - Total: 8
- Time zone: UTC+3:30 (IRST)
  - Summer (DST): UTC+4:30 (IRDT)

Darreh Shur (Persian: دره شور, also Romanized as Darreh Shūr; also known as Darrehshūr) is a village in Shalil Rural District, Miankuh District, Ardal County, Chaharmahal and Bakhtiari Province, Iran. At the 2006 census, its population was 8, in 8 families.
