= Emamabad, Minab =

Emamabad امام اباد
- Village
- Location within Iran
- Coordinates: 26°55′45″N 57°43′01″E
- Country: Iran
- Province: Hormozgan
- County: Minab
- Bakhsh: Senderk
- Rural District: Bondar

Population (2006)
  - Total: 90
- Time zone: UTC+3:30 (IRST)
  - Summer (DST): UTC+4:30 (IRDT)

Emamabad (Persian: امام اباد, also romanized as Emāmābād) is a village in Bondar Rural District, Senderk District, Minab County, Hormozgan Province, Iran. At the 2006 census, its population was 90, in 21 families.
