= Měšín =

- Municipality
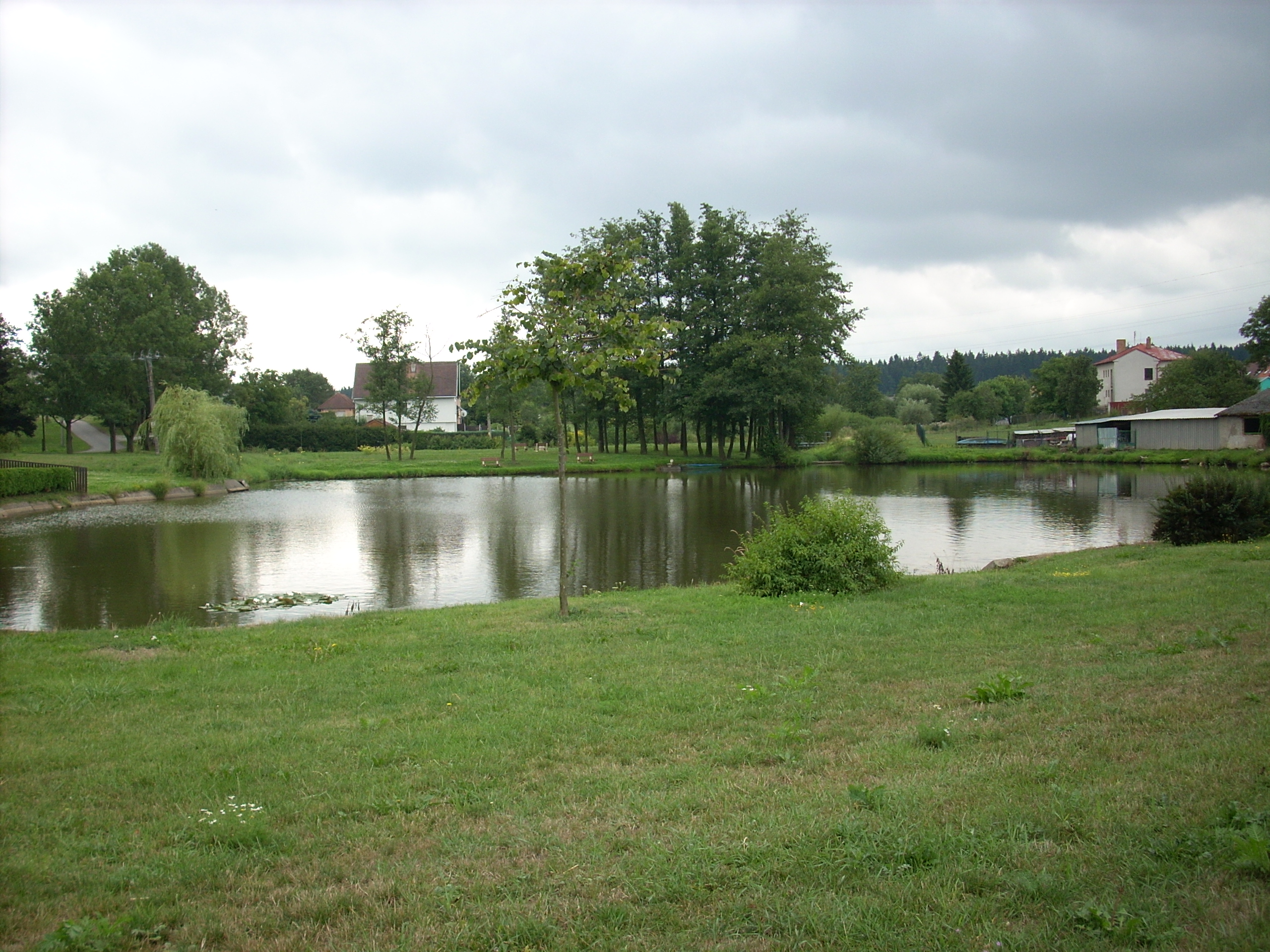
- Centre of Měšín

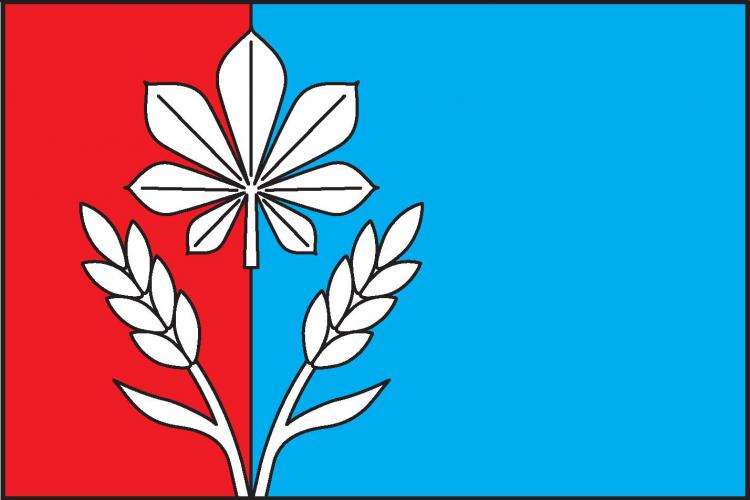
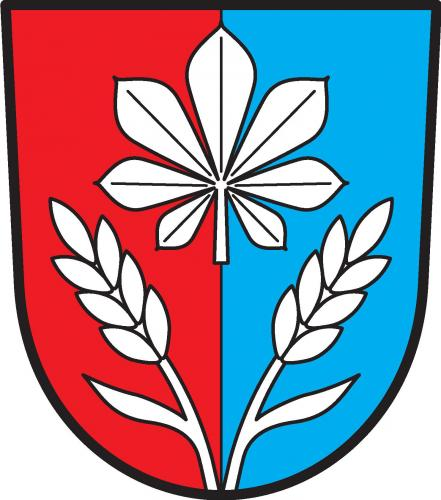
- Flag Coat of arms

- Location in the Czech Republic
- Coordinates: 49°26′14″N 15°39′25″E
- Country: Czech Republic
- Region: Vysočina
- District: Jihlava
- First mentioned: 1368

Area
  - Total: 7.06 km^{2} (2.73 sq mi)
- Elevation: 510 m (1,670 ft)

Population (2026-01-01)
  - Total: 271
  - Density: 38.4/km^{2} (99.4/sq mi)
- Time zone: UTC+1 (CET)
  - Summer (DST): UTC+2 (CEST)
- Postal code: 586 01
- Website: www.mesin.cz

Měšín (Czech pronunciation: [ˈmɲɛʃiːn]) is a municipality and village in Jihlava District in the Vysočina Region of the Czech Republic. It has about 300 inhabitants.

Měšín lies approximately 8 kilometres (5 mi) north-east of Jihlava and 115 km (71 mi) south-east of Prague.

== Demographics ==
Historical population
Year	Pop.	±%
1869	247	—
1880	271	+9.7%
1890	272	+0.4%
1900	265	−2.6%
1910	243	−8.3%
1921	263	+8.2%
1930	246	−6.5%
1950	184	−25.2%
1961	160	−13.0%
1970	156	−2.5%
1980	152	−2.6%
1991	167	+9.9%
2001	187	+12.0%
2011	229	+22.5%
2021	266	+16.2%
Source: Censuses
