= Darreh Shur, Markazi =

Village in Markazi, Iran

Darreh Shur دره شور
- Village
- Location within Iran
- Coordinates: 33°46′01″N 49°55′49″E
- Country: Iran
- Province: Markazi
- County: Khomeyn
- Bakhsh: Kamareh
- Rural District: Khorram Dasht

Population (2006)
  - Total: 58
- Time zone: UTC+3:30 (IRST)
  - Summer (DST): UTC+4:30 (IRDT)

Darreh Shur (Persian: دره شور, also Romanized as Darreh Shūr) is a village in Khorram Dasht Rural District, Kamareh District, Khomeyn County, Markazi Province, Iran. At the 2006 census, its population was 58, in 18 families.
