= Qalehchi-ye Pain =

Village in Markazi, Iran

Qalehchi-ye Pain قلعه چي پائين
- Village
- Location within Iran
- Coordinates: 33°58′27″N 49°07′40″E
- Country: Iran
- Province: Markazi
- County: Shazand
- Bakhsh: Zalian
- Rural District: Nahr-e Mian

Population (2006)
  - Total: 166
- Time zone: UTC+3:30 (IRST)
  - Summer (DST): UTC+4:30 (IRDT)

Qalehchi-ye Pain (Persian: قلعه چي پائين, also Romanized as Qal‘ehchī-ye Pā’īn; also known as Qalāchī-ye Soflá and Qal‘ehchī-ye Soflá) is a village in Nahr-e Mian Rural District, Zalian District, Shazand County, Markazi Province, Iran. At the 2006 census, its population was 166, in 45 families.
