= Javanmardi Rural District =

Rural district in Chaharmahal and Bakhtiari province, Iran

Javanmardi Rural District Persian: دهستان جوانمردئ
- Rural District
- Location within Iran
- Coordinates: 31°28′N 51°09′E
- Country: Iran
- Province: Chaharmahal and Bakhtiari
- County: Khanmirza
- District: Central
- Established: 2001
- Capital: Javanmardi

Population (2016)
  - Total: 10,775
- Time zone: UTC+3:30 (IRST)

Javanmardi Rural District (Persian: دهستان جوانمردئ) is in the Central District of Khanmirza County, Chaharmahal and Bakhtiari province, Iran. Its capital is the village of Javanmardi.

== Demographics ==
=== Population ===
At the time of the 2006 National Census, the rural district's population (as a part of the former Khanmirza District in Lordegan County) was 9,642 in 2,022 households. There were 10,015 inhabitants in 2,462 households at the following census of 2011. The 2016 census measured the population of the rural district as 10,775 in 3,102 households. The most populous of its 13 villages was Bagh-e Behzad, with 2,454 people.

In 2019, the district was separated from the county in the establishment of Khanmirza County, and the rural district was transferred to the new Central District.

=== Other villages in the rural district ===
- Baba Mansur
- Hasan Hendow
- Qaleh-ye Afghan
- Salah Chin
- Sileh
