= Milas Rural District =

Rural district in Chaharmahal and Bakhtiari province, Iran

Milas Rural District Persian: دهستان ميلاس
- Rural District
- Location within Iran
- Coordinates: 31°31′N 50°47′E
- Country: Iran
- Province: Chaharmahal and Bakhtiari
- County: Lordegan
- District: Central
- Established: 1987
- Capital: Gusheh

Population (2016)
  - Total: 34,885
- Time zone: UTC+3:30 (IRST)

Milas Rural District (Persian: دهستان ميلاس) is in the Central District of Lordegan County, Chaharmahal and Bakhtiari province, Iran. Its capital is the village of Gusheh.

== Demographics ==
=== Population ===
At the time of the 2006 National Census, the rural district's population was 34,258 in 6,493 households. There were 31,092 inhabitants in 7,099 households at the following census of 2011. The 2016 census measured the population of the rural district as 34,885 in 8,899 households. The most populous of its 55 villages was Fajr-e Bar Aftab, (Note: Formerly known as Shahrak-e Baraftab-e Shirani) with 6,895 people.

=== Other villages in the rural district ===
- Bagh Anar-e Milas
- Bar Aftab-e Milas
- Darjuneh
- Deh Now-e Milas-e Sofla
- Karf-e Olya
- Milas
- Naghan-e Sofla
- Shesh Bahreh-ye Mianeh
- Shesh Bahreh-ye Olya
- Tall Maran
