= Armand Rural District =

Rural district in Chaharmahal and Bakhtiari province, Iran

Armand Rural District Persian: دهستان ارمند
- Rural District
- Location within Iran
- Coordinates: 31°38′N 50°52′E
- Country: Iran
- Province: Chaharmahal and Bakhtiari
- County: Khanmirza
- District: Armand
- Established: 1987
- Capital: Armand

Population (2016)
  - Total: 17,368
- Time zone: UTC+3:30 (IRST)

Armand Rural District (Persian: دهستان ارمند) is in Armand District of Khanmirza County, Chaharmahal and Bakhtiari province, Iran. Its capital is the village of Armand. The previous capital of the rural district was the village of Tang Kolureh.

== Demographics ==
=== Population ===
At the time of the 2006 National Census, the rural district's population (as a part of the Central District in Lordegan County) was 14,320 in 3,016 households. There were 16,080 inhabitants in 3,906 households at the following census of 2011. The 2016 census measured the population of the rural district as 17,368 in 4,539 households. The most populous of its 22 villages was Buger, with 2,775 people.

In 2019, the rural district was separated from the county in the establishment of Khanmirza County and transferred to the new Armand District.

=== Other villages in the rural district ===
- Ab Chenar
- Armand-e Sofla
- Chah Gah
- Kinak
