= Armand District =

District in Chaharmahal and Bakhtiari province, Iran

Armand District Persian: بخش ارمند
- District
- Location within Iran
- Coordinates: 31°38′N 50°52′E
- Country: Iran
- Province: Chaharmahal and Bakhtiari
- County: Khanmirza
- Established: 2019
- Capital: Armand
- Time zone: UTC+3:30 (IRST)

Armand District (Persian: بخش بخش ارمند) is in Khanmirza County of Chaharmahal and Bakhtiari province, Iran. Its capital is the village of Armand, whose population at the time of the 2016 National Census was 2,070 in 563 households.

== History ==
In 2019, Armand Rural District and Khanmirza District were separated from Lordegan County in the establishment of Khanmirza County, which was divided into two districts of two rural districts each, with Aluni as its capital and only city at the time.

Armand District
Administrative Divisions
Armand RD
Sepidar RD
RD = Rural District
