= Khanmirza Rural District =

Rural district in Chaharmahal and Bakhtiari province, Iran

Khanmirza Rural District Persian: دهستان خانميرزا
- Rural District
- Location within Iran
- Coordinates: 31°34′N 51°07′E
- Country: Iran
- Province: Chaharmahal and Bakhtiari
- County: Khanmirza
- District: Central
- Established: 1987
- Capital: Do Makan

Population (2016)
  - Total: 20,337
- Time zone: UTC+3:30 (IRST)

Khanmirza Rural District (Persian: دهستان خانميرزا) is in the Central District of Khanmirza County, Chaharmahal and Bakhtiari province, Iran. Its capital is the village of Do Makan. The previous capital of the rural district was the village of Aluni, now a city.

== Demographics ==
=== Population ===
At the time of the 2006 National Census, the rural district's population (as a part of the former Khanmirza District in Lordegan County) was 19,381 in 3,888 households. There were 18,891 inhabitants in 4,530 households at the following census of 2011. The 2016 census measured the population of the rural district as 20,337 in 5,388 households. The most populous of its 24 villages was Do Makan, with 2,764 people.

In 2019, the district was separated from the county in the establishment of Khanmirza County, and the rural district was transferred to the new Central District.

=== Other villages in the rural district ===
- Aliabad-e Poshteh
- Bard Bor
- Berjui
- Deh Sahra
- Kalamui
- Kerat Gol-e Sofla
- Moradan
