= Central District (Khanmirza County) =

District in Chaharmahal and Bakhtiari province, Iran

Central District (Khanmirza County) Persian: بخش مرکزی شهرستان خانمیرزا
- District
- Location within Iran
- Coordinates: 31°32′N 51°06′E
- Country: Iran
- Province: Chaharmahal and Bakhtiari
- County: Khanmirza
- Established: 2019
- Capital: Aluni
- Time zone: UTC+3:30 (IRST)

The Central District of Khanmirza County (Persian: بخش مرکزی شهرستان خانمیرزا) is in Chaharmahal and Bakhtiari province, Iran. Its capital is the city of Aluni, whose population at the time of the 2016 National Census was 2,775 in 734 households.

== History ==
In 2019, Armand Rural District and Khanmirza District were separated from Lordegan County in the establishment of Khanmirza County, which was divided into two districts of two rural districts each, with Aluni as its capital and only city at the time.

== Demographics ==
=== Administrative divisions ===
Central District (Khanmirza County)
Administrative Divisions
Javanmardi RD
Khanmirza RD
Aluni (city)
RD = Rural District
