= Khanmirza District =

Former district in Chaharmahal and Bakhtiari province, Iran

Khanmirza District Persian: بخش خانمیرزا
- Former District
- Location within Iran
- Coordinates: 31°34′N 51°03′E
- Country: Iran
- Province: Chaharmahal and Bakhtiari
- County: Lordegan
- Established: 1995
- Capital: Aluni

Population (2016)
  - Total: 36,360
- Time zone: UTC+3:30 (IRST)

Khanmirza District (Persian: بخش خانمیرزا) is a former administrative division of Lordegan County, Chaharmahal and Bakhtiari province, Iran. Its capital was the city of Aluni.

== History ==
In 2019, the district was separated from the county in the establishment of Khanmirza County.

== Demographics ==
=== Population ===
At the time of the 2006 National Census, the district's population was 31,320 in 6,391 households. The following census in 2011 counted 33,000 people in 7,915 households. The 2016 census measured the population of the district as 36,360 inhabitants living in 9,872 households.

=== Administrative divisions ===
Khanmirza District Population
Administrative Divisions	2006	2011	2016
Javanmardi RD	9,642	10,015	10,775
Khanmirza RD	19,381	18,891	20,337
Aluni (city)	2,297	4,094	5,248
Total	31,320	33,000	36,360
RD = Rural District
