= Central District (Lordegan County) =

District in Chaharmahal and Bakhtiari province, Iran

Central District (Lordegan County) Persian: بخش مرکزی شهرستان لردگان
- District
- Location within Iran
- Coordinates: 31°27′N 50°53′E
- Country: Iran
- Province: Chaharmahal and Bakhtiari
- County: Lordegan
- Capital: Lordegan

Population (2016)
  - Total: 105,538
- Time zone: UTC+3:30 (IRST)

The Central District of Lordegan County (Persian: بخش مرکزی شهرستان لردگان) is in Chaharmahal and Bakhtiari province, Iran. Its capital is the city of Lordegan.

== History ==
In 2011, Sardasht Rural District was separated from the district in the formation of Talayeh District. (Note: Renamed Rudasht District) In 2019, Armand Rural District was separated from the Central District in the establishment of Khanmirza County.

== Demographics ==
=== Population ===
At the time of the 2006 National Census, the district's population was 96,483 in 18,689 households. The following census in 2011 counted 110,807 people in 25,084 households. The 2016 census measured the population of the district as 105,538 in 27,364 households.

=== Administrative divisions ===
Central District (Lordegan County) Population
Administrative Divisions	2006	2011	2016
Armand RD (Note: Transferred to Khanmirza County after the 2016 census)	14,320	16,080	17,368
Milas RD	34,258	31,092	34,885
Rig RD	12,171	13,511	12,757
Sardasht RD (Note: Transferred to Rudasht District)	13,006	14,848	
Lordegan (city)	22,728	35,276	40,528
Total	96,483	110,807	105,538
RD = Rural District
