= Khanmirza County =

County in Chaharmahal and Bakhtiari province, Iran

Khanmirza County Persian: شهرستان خانمیرزا
- County
- Location of Khanmirza County in Chaharmahal and Bakhtiari province (bottom, purple)

- Location of Chaharmahal and Bakhtiari province in Iran
- Coordinates: 31°34′N 51°03′E
- Country: Iran
- Province: Chaharmahal and Bakhtiari
- Established: 2019
- Capital: Aluni
- District: Central, Armand
- Time zone: UTC+3:30 (IRST)

Khanmirza County (Persian: شهرستان خانمیرزا) is in Chaharmahal and Bakhtiari province, Iran. Its capital is the city of Aluni, whose population at the time of the 2016 National Census was 2,775 in 734 households.

== History ==
In 2019, Armand Rural District and Khanmirza District were separated from Lordegan County to establish Khanmirza County. The new county was divided into two districts of two rural districts each, with Aluni as its capital and only city at the time.

== Demographics ==
=== Administrative divisions ===
Khanmirza County's administrative structure is shown in the following table.

Khanmirza County
Administrative Divisions
Central District
Javanmardi RD
Khanmirza RD
Aluni (city)
Armand District
Armand RD
Sepidar RD
RD = Rural District

== See also ==
Media related to Khanmirza County at Wikimedia Commons
