= Lordegan County =

County in Chaharmahal and Bakhtiari province, Iran

Lordegan County Persian: شهرستان لردگان
- County
- Location of Lordegan County in Chaharmahal and Bakhtiari province (bottom, pink)

- Location of Chaharmahal and Bakhtiari province in Iran
- Coordinates: 31°29′N 50°42′E
- Country: Iran
- Province: Chaharmahal and Bakhtiari
- Capital: Lordegan
- Districts: Central, Manj, Rudasht

Population (2016)
  - Total: 209,681
- Time zone: UTC+3:30 (IRST)

Lordegan County (Persian: شهرستان لردگان) is in Chaharmahal and Bakhtiari province, Iran. Its capital is the city of Lordegan.

== History ==
Three villages merged to form the city of Manj-e Nesa in 2011. In the same year, Sardasht Rural District was separated from the Central District in the formation of Talayeh District, (Note: Renamed Rudasht District) including the new Dudera Rural District. In addition, four villages merged in forming the village of Sardasht, which was converted to a city in 2013.

In 2019, Armand Rural District and Khanmirza District were separated from the county in the establishment of Khanmirza County. Falard District (Note: Renamed the Central District of Falard County) was separated from the county to establish Falard County in 2022.

In late December 2025, the county joined the nationwide protests again the Iranian regime.

== Demographics ==
=== Language ===
Bakhtiari tribes are predominant inhabitants of Lordegan county. People mainly speak Luri language by Bakhtiari dialect, which is a member of Southwestern Iranian languages.

=== Population ===
At the time of the 2006 National Census, the county's population was 175,289, in 34,603 households. The following census in 2011 counted 194,783 people in 44,921 households. The 2016 census measured the population of the county as 209,681 in 54,825 households.

=== Administrative divisions ===
Lordegan County's population history and administrative structure over three consecutive censuses are shown in the following table.

Lordegan County Population
Administrative Divisions	2006	2011	2016
Central District	96,483	110,807	105,538
Armand RD (Note: Transferred to Khanmirza County)	14,320	16,080	17,368
Milas RD	34,258	31,092	34,885
Rig RD	12,171	13,511	12,757
Sardasht RD	13,006	14,848	
Lordegan (city)	22,728	35,276	40,528
Falard District (Note: Transferred to Falard County and renamed the Central District of Falard County)	30,254	32,944	33,023
Falard RD	18,723	19,671	19,918
Poshtkuh RD	8,569	9,575	9,081
Mal-e Khalifeh (city)	2,962	3,698	4,024
Khanmirza District	31,320	33,000	36,360
Javanmardi RD	9,642	10,015	10,775
Khanmirza RD	19,381	18,891	20,337
Aluni (city)	2,297	4,094	5,248
Manj District	17,232	18,032	17,998
Barez RD	8,024	8,385	7,933
Manj RD	9,208	8,161	8,573
Manj-e Nesa (city) (Note: Merger of several villages)		1,486	1,492
Rudasht District (Note: Formerly Talayeh District)			16,762
Dudera RD			1,860
Sardasht RD			9,211
Sardasht (city) (Note: Merger of several villages)			5,691
Total	175,289	194,783	209,681
RD = Rural District

== Geography ==
The Milas Plain (دشت ميلاس) (Note: Also romanized as Mīlās) is found in Lordegan County. Wheat, rice and barley are cultivated in the plain.

== See also ==
Media related to Lordegan County at Wikimedia Commons
