= Pataveh (disambiguation) =

Pataveh is a city in Kohgiluyeh and Boyer-Ahmad Province, Iran.

Pataveh (Persian: پاتاوه or پاتوه or پاطاوه) may refer to:

- Pataveh, Chaharmahal and Bakhtiari (پاتوه - Pātāveh), Chaharmahal and Bakhtiari Province
- Pataveh, Hormozgan (پاتوه - Pātaveh), Hormozgan Province
- Pataveh, Dehdez (پاتاوه - Pātāveh), Khuzestan Province
- Pataveh, Susan (پاتوه - Pātaveh), Khuzestan Province
- Pataveh, Boyer-Ahmad (پاتاوه - Pātāveh), Kohgiluyeh and Boyer-Ahmad Province
- Pataveh-ye Delita (پاتاوه - Pātāveh), Boyer-Ahmad County, Kohgiluyeh and Boyer-Ahmad Province
- Pataveh-ye Gelal (پاتوه - Pātaveh), Boyer-Ahmad County, Kohgiluyeh and Boyer-Ahmad Province
- Pataveh-ye Kari (پاتاوه - Pātāveh), Chaman County, Kohgiluyeh and Boyer-Ahmad Province
- Pataveh-ye Ajam (پاتاوه - Pātāveh), Kohgiluyeh County, Kohgiluyeh and Boyer-Ahmad Province
- Pataveh-ye Charusa (پاتاوه - Pātāveh), Kohgiluyeh County, Kohgiluyeh and Boyer-Ahmad Province
- Pataveh-ye Pey Rah (پاتاوه - Pātāveh), Kohgiluyeh County, Kohgiluyeh and Boyer-Ahmad Province
- Pataveh-ye Rud Sameh (پاطاوه - Pāţāveh), Kohgiluyeh County, Kohgiluyeh and Boyer-Ahmad Province
- Pataveh, Landeh (پاتاوه - Pātāveh), Kohgiluyeh and Boyer-Ahmad Province
- Pataveh District, in Dana County, Kohgiluyeh and Boyer-Ahmad Province
- Pataveh Rural District, in Dana County, Kohgiluyeh and Boyer-Ahmad Province
