= Sarbisheh (disambiguation) =

Sarbisheh is a city in South Khorasan Province, Iran.

Sarbisheh or Sar Bisheh (Persian: سربيشه) may also refer to:

- Sar Bisheh, Chaharmahal and Bakhtiari
- Sar Bisheh, Fars
- Sarbisheh, Ilam
- Sar Bisheh, Isfahan
- Sar Bisheh, Dezful, Khuzestan Province
- Sar Bisheh, Kohgiluyeh and Boyer-Ahmad
- Sar Bisheh-ye Olya, Kohgiluyeh and Boyer-Ahmad Province
- Sar Bisheh-ye Sofla, Kohgiluyeh and Boyer-Ahmad Province
- Sar Bisheh, Lorestan
- Sarbisheh County, in South Khorasan Province

== See also ==
- Bisheh Sar, Mazandaran Province
