= LIR =

LIR or Lir may refer to:

- Ler (mythology), sea god in Irish mythology, also known as Lir
- Liberia, UNDP country code LIR
- Lir (band)
- Lir, Chaharmahal and Bakhtiari, a village in Chaharmahal and Bakhtiari Province, Iran
- Lir Abi (disambiguation), villages in Chaharmahal and Bakhtiari Province, Iran
- Lir-e Shamlek, a village in Chaharmahal and Bakhtiari Province, Iran
- Lir, Masal, a village in Gilan Province, Iran
- Lir, Talesh, a village in Gilan Province, Iran
- Lir, Hormozgan, a village in Hormozgan Province, Iran
- Lir-e Bozorg, a village in Kohgiluyeh and Boyer-Ahmad Province, Iran
- Lir-e Kuchek, a village in Kohgiluyeh and Boyer-Ahmad Province, Iran
- Lir Tahrak, a village in Kohgiluyeh and Boyer-Ahmad Province, Iran
- Lir, Markazi, a village in Markazi Province, Iran
- Local Internet registry
- London Irish Rifles, reserve infantry regiment and then company of the British Army
- IATA airport code for Daniel Oduber Quirós International Airport in Costa Rica
