= Talkheh Zar =

Talkheh Zar or Talkhehzar (Persian: تلخه زار) may refer to:

- Talkheh Zar, Charam
- Talkheh Zar, Kohgiluyeh
- Talkheh Zar-e Olya, Kohgiluyeh County
- Talkheh Zar-e Sofla, Kohgiluyeh County
