= Kelayeh =

Kelayeh (Persian: كلايه) may refer to:

- Kelayeh-ye Olya
- Kelayeh-ye Sofla
- Kelayeh-ye Vosta
