= Kalgeh Borun =

Kalgeh Borun كلگه برون
- Village
- Location within Iran
- Coordinates: 30°39′35″N 50°31′08″E
- Country: Iran
- Province: Kohgiluyeh and Boyer-Ahmad
- County: Kohgiluyeh
- Bakhsh: Central
- Rural District: Dehdasht-e Gharbi

Population (2006)
  - Total: 173
- Time zone: UTC+3:30 (IRST)
  - Summer (DST): UTC+4:30 (IRDT)

Kalgeh Borun (Persian: كلگه برون, also Romanized as Kalgeh Borūn) is a village in Dehdasht-e Gharbi Rural District, in the Central District of Kohgiluyeh County, Kohgiluyeh and Boyer-Ahmad Province, Iran. At the 2006 census, its population was 173, in 35 families.
