= Darreh Geru =

Darreh Geru or Darreh Gerow (Persian: دره گرو), also rendered as Darreh Geruh or Darreh Goruh, may refer to:

- Darreh Gerow Chong
- Darreh Geru-ye Olya
- Darreh Geru-ye Sofla
