= Dam-e Abbas =

Dam-e Abbas دم عباس
- Village
- Location within Iran
- Coordinates: 31°04′40″N 50°35′43″E
- Country: Iran
- Province: Kohgiluyeh and Boyer-Ahmad
- County: Kohgiluyeh
- Bakhsh: Central
- Rural District: Doshman Ziari

Population (2006)
  - Total: 146
- Time zone: UTC+3:30 (IRST)
  - Summer (DST): UTC+4:30 (IRDT)

Dam-e Abbas (Persian: دم عباس, also Romanized as Dam-e ‘Abbās; also known as Qaryeh-ye Dam ‘Abbās) is a village in Doshman Ziari Rural District, in the Central District of Kohgiluyeh County, Kohgiluyeh and Boyer-Ahmad Province, Iran. At the 2006 census, its population was 146, in 27 families.
