= Kal Khvajeh-ye Qeysari =

Kal Khvajeh-ye Qeysari كل خواجه قيصري
- Village
- Country: Iran
- Province: Kohgiluyeh and Boyer-Ahmad
- County: Kohgiluyeh
- Bakhsh: Central
- Rural District: Rak

Population (2006)
  - Total: 134
- Time zone: UTC+3:30 (IRST)
  - Summer (DST): UTC+4:30 (IRDT)

Kal Khvajeh-ye Qeysari (Persian: كل خواجه قيصري, also Romanized as Kal Khvājeh-ye Qeyṣarī) is a village in Rak Rural District, in the Central District of Kohgiluyeh County, Kohgiluyeh and Boyer-Ahmad Province, Iran. As of the 2006 census, its population was 134, in 22 families.
