= Bardkashki =

Bardkashki بردكشكي
- Village
- Location within Iran
- Coordinates: 30°55′06″N 50°21′59″E
- Country: Iran
- Province: Kohgiluyeh and Boyer-Ahmad
- County: Kohgiluyeh
- Bakhsh: Central
- Rural District: Tayebi-ye Garmsiri-ye Jonubi

Population (2006)
  - Total: 75
- Time zone: UTC+3:30 (IRST)
  - Summer (DST): UTC+4:30 (IRDT)

Bardkashki (Persian: بردكشكي, also Romanized as Bardkashkī; also known as Barkashkī and Barkashkī-ye Pā’īn) is a village in Tayebi-ye Garmsiri-ye Jonubi Rural District, in the Central District of Kohgiluyeh County, Kohgiluyeh and Boyer-Ahmad Province, Iran. At the 2006 census, its population was 75, in 16 families.
