= Deh-e Pakel Allah Reza =

Deh-e Pakel Allah Reza ده پاكل اله رضا
- Village
- Country: Iran
- Province: Kohgiluyeh and Boyer-Ahmad
- County: Kohgiluyeh
- Bakhsh: Central
- Rural District: Dehdasht-e Sharqi

Population (2006)
  - Total: 139
- Time zone: UTC+3:30 (IRST)
  - Summer (DST): UTC+4:30 (IRDT)

Deh-e Pakel Allah Reza (Persian: ده پاكل اله رضا, also Romanized as Deh-e Pākel Allah Rez̤ā) is a village in Dehdasht-e Sharqi Rural District, in the Central District of Kohgiluyeh County, Kohgiluyeh and Boyer-Ahmad Province, Iran. At the 2006 census, its population was 139, in 27 families.
