= Sheykh Jan-e Bazkarbasi =

Sheykh Jan-e Bazkarbasi شيخ جانبازكرباسي
- Village
- Country: Iran
- Province: Kohgiluyeh and Boyer-Ahmad
- County: Kohgiluyeh
- Bakhsh: Central
- Rural District: Rak

Population (2006)
  - Total: 53
- Time zone: UTC+3:30 (IRST)
  - Summer (DST): UTC+4:30 (IRDT)

Sheykh Jan-e Bazkarbasi (Persian: شيخ جانبازكرباسي, also Romanized as Sheykh Jān-e Bāzkarbāsī) is a village in Rak Rural District, in the Central District of Kohgiluyeh County, Kohgiluyeh and Boyer-Ahmad Province, Iran. At the 2006 census, its population was 53, in 11 families.
