= Tol-e Kuchak Khiarkar =

Tol-e Kuchak Khiarkar تل كوچك خياركار
- Village
- Location within Iran
- Coordinates: 30°50′51″N 50°37′12″E
- Country: Iran
- Province: Kohgiluyeh and Boyer-Ahmad
- County: Kohgiluyeh
- Bakhsh: Central
- Rural District: Dehdasht-e Sharqi

Population (2006)
  - Total: 214
- Time zone: UTC+3:30 (IRST)
  - Summer (DST): UTC+4:30 (IRDT)

Tol-e Kuchak Khiarkar (Persian: تل كوچك خياركار, also Romanized as Tol-e Kūchak Khīārkār; also known as Tol-e Kūchak) is a village in Dehdasht-e Sharqi Rural District, in the Central District of Kohgiluyeh County, Kohgiluyeh and Boyer-Ahmad Province, Iran. At the 2006 census, its population was 214, in 35 families.
