= Tulian =

Tulian طوليان
- Village
- Location within Iran
- Coordinates: 30°50′41″N 50°34′51″E
- Country: Iran
- Province: Kohgiluyeh and Boyer-Ahmad
- County: Kohgiluyeh
- Bakhsh: Central
- Rural District: Dehdasht-e Sharqi

Population (2006)
  - Total: 1,393
- Time zone: UTC+3:30 (IRST)
  - Summer (DST): UTC+4:30 (IRDT)

Tulian (Persian: طوليان, also Romanized as Ţūlīān, Tūleyān, Tūlīān, and Tūlīyān) is a village in Dehdasht-e Sharqi Rural District, in the Central District of Kohgiluyeh County, Kohgiluyeh and Boyer-Ahmad Province, Iran. At the 2006 census, its population was 1,393, in 253 families.

== Notable people ==
- Ali Asghar Hussayni, Shia Cleric
- Ali Mohammad Bozorgvari, Shia Cleric
