= Gavdaneh-ye Ali Reza =

Gavdaneh-ye Ali Reza گاودانه عليرضا
- Village
- Location within Iran
- Coordinates: 30°58′09″N 50°37′00″E
- Country: Iran
- Province: Kohgiluyeh and Boyer-Ahmad
- County: Kohgiluyeh
- Bakhsh: Central
- Rural District: Doshman Ziari

Population (2006)
  - Total: 198
- Time zone: UTC+3:30 (IRST)
  - Summer (DST): UTC+4:30 (IRDT)

Gavdaneh-ye Ali Reza (Persian: گاودانه عليرضا, also Romanized as Gāvdāneh-ye ʿAlī Rez̤ā; also known as Gāvdāneh) is a village in Doshman Ziari Rural District, in the Central District of Kohgiluyeh County, Kohgiluyeh and Boyer-Ahmad Province, Iran. At the 2006 census, its population was 198, in 32 families.
