= Dasht-e Qazi =

Dasht-e Qazi دشت قاضي
- Village
- Location within Iran
- Coordinates: 30°58′00″N 50°35′21″E
- Country: Iran
- Province: Kohgiluyeh and Boyer-Ahmad
- County: Kohgiluyeh
- Bakhsh: Central
- Rural District: Doshman Ziari

Population (2006)
  - Total: 240
- Time zone: UTC+3:30 (IRST)
  - Summer (DST): UTC+4:30 (IRDT)

Dasht-e Qazi (Persian: دشت قاضي, also Romanized as Dasht-e Qāẕī) is a village in Doshman Ziari Rural District, in the Central District of Kohgiluyeh County, Kohgiluyeh and Boyer-Ahmad Province, Iran. At the 2006 census, its population was 240, in 45 families.
