= Puzeh-ye Kharaftkhaneh =

Puzeh-ye Kharaftkhaneh پوزه خرفتخانه
- Village
- Country: Iran
- Province: Kohgiluyeh and Boyer-Ahmad
- County: Kohgiluyeh
- Bakhsh: Central
- Rural District: Dehdasht-e Sharqi

Population (2006)
  - Total: 28
- Time zone: UTC+3:30 (IRST)
  - Summer (DST): UTC+4:30 (IRDT)

Puzeh-ye Kharaftkhaneh (Persian: پوزه خرفتخانه, also Romanized as Pūzeh-ye Kharaftkhāneh) is a village in Dehdasht-e Sharqi Rural District, in the Central District of Kohgiluyeh County, Kohgiluyeh and Boyer-Ahmad Province, Iran. At the 2006 census, its population was 28, in 5 families.
