= Cham-e Ali Mordani =

Cham-e Ali Mordani چم علي مرداني
- Village
- Location within Iran
- Coordinates: 30°55′44″N 50°21′22″E
- Country: Iran
- Province: Kohgiluyeh and Boyer-Ahmad
- County: Kohgiluyeh
- Bakhsh: Central
- Rural District: Tayebi-ye Garmsiri-ye Jonubi

Population (2006)
  - Total: 20
- Time zone: UTC+3:30 (IRST)
  - Summer (DST): UTC+4:30 (IRDT)

Cham-e Ali Mordani (Persian: چم علي مرداني, also Romanized as Cham ʿAlī Mordānī; also known as Cham-e Alimardan) is a village in Tayebi-ye Garmsiri-ye Jonubi Rural District, in the Central District of Kohgiluyeh County, Kohgiluyeh and Boyer-Ahmad Province, Iran. At the 2006 census, its population was 20, in 6 families.
