= Tang-e Sukhteh-ye Lirab =

Village in Kohgiluyeh and Boyer-Ahmad, Iran

Tang-e Sukhteh-ye Lirab تنگ سوخته ليراب
- Village
- Location within Iran
- Coordinates: 30°46′39″N 51°19′29″E
- Country: Iran
- Province: Kohgiluyeh and Boyer-Ahmad
- County: Kohgiluyeh
- Bakhsh: Dishmok
- Rural District: Bahmayi-ye Sarhadi-ye Sharqi

Population (2006)
  - Total: 118
- Time zone: UTC+3:30 (IRST)
  - Summer (DST): UTC+4:30 (IRDT)

Tang-e Sukhteh-ye Lirab (Persian: تنگ سوخته ليراب, also Romanized as Tang-e Sūkhteh-ye Līrāb; also known as Tang-e Sūkhteh and Tong Sūkhteh) is a village in Bahmayi-ye Sarhadi-ye Sharqi Rural District, Dishmok District, Kohgiluyeh County, Kohgiluyeh and Boyer-Ahmad Province, Iran. At the 2006 census, its population was 118, in 20 families.
