= Kuh-e Rak =

Kuh-e Rak كوه راك
- Village
- Location within Iran
- Coordinates: 30°54′07″N 50°29′05″E
- Country: Iran
- Province: Kohgiluyeh and Boyer-Ahmad
- County: Kohgiluyeh
- Bakhsh: Central
- Rural District: Rak

Population (2006)
  - Total: 146
- Time zone: UTC+3:30 (IRST)
  - Summer (DST): UTC+4:30 (IRDT)

Kuh-e Rak (Persian: كوه راك, also Romanized as Kūh-e Rāk) is a village in Rak Rural District, in the Central District of Kohgiluyeh County, Kohgiluyeh and Boyer-Ahmad Province, Iran. At the 2006 census, its population was 146, in 37 families.
