= Ab Balutak =

Ab Balutak اب بلوطك
- Village
- Location within Iran
- Coordinates: 30°55′16″N 50°34′47″E
- Country: Iran
- Province: Kohgiluyeh and Boyer-Ahmad
- County: Kohgiluyeh
- Bakhsh: Central
- Rural District: Dehdasht-e Sharqi

Population (2006)
  - Total: 141
- Time zone: UTC+3:30 (IRST)
  - Summer (DST): UTC+4:30 (IRDT)

Ab Balutak (Persian: اب بلوطك, also Romanized as Āb Balūṭak; also known as Ābbalūṭak) is a village in Dehdasht-e Sharqi Rural District, in the Central District of Kohgiluyeh County, Kohgiluyeh and Boyer-Ahmad province, Iran. According to the 2006 census, it had a population of 141 in 23 families.
