= Kuh Pat =

Kuh Pat كوه پات
- Village
- Location within Iran
- Coordinates: 30°57′08″N 50°31′25″E
- Country: Iran
- Province: Kohgiluyeh and Boyer-Ahmad
- County: Kohgiluyeh
- Bakhsh: Central
- Rural District: Rak

Population (2006)
  - Total: 19
- Time zone: UTC+3:30 (IRST)
  - Summer (DST): UTC+4:30 (IRDT)

Kuh Pat (Persian: كوه پات, also Romanized as Kūh Pat; also known as Pā’īn Kūh-e Pāt and Pā’īn Kūh Pāt) is a village in Rak Rural District, in the Central District of Kohgiluyeh County, Kohgiluyeh and Boyer-Ahmad Province, Iran. At the 2006 census, its population was 19, in 5 families.
