= Kalat Buneh Rah Dozdan =

Kalat Buneh Rah Dozdan كلات بونه راه دزدان
- Village
- Country: Iran
- Province: Kohgiluyeh and Boyer-Ahmad
- County: Kohgiluyeh
- Bakhsh: Dishmok
- Rural District: Bahmayi-ye Sarhadi-ye Sharqi

Population (2006)
  - Total: 220
- Time zone: UTC+3:30 (IRST)
  - Summer (DST): UTC+4:30 (IRDT)

Kalat Buneh Rah Dozdan (Persian: كلات بونه راه دزدان, also Romanized as Kalāt Būneh Rāh Dozdān) is a village in Bahmayi-ye Sarhadi-ye Sharqi Rural District, Dishmok District, Kohgiluyeh County, Kohgiluyeh and Boyer-Ahmad Province, Iran. At the 2006 census, its population was 220, in 37 families.
