= Darreh Zari-ye Ajam =

Village in Kohgiluyeh and Boyer-Ahmad, Iran

Darreh Zari-ye Ajam دره زري اجم
- Village
- Location within Iran
- Coordinates: 31°14′24″N 50°41′11″E
- Country: Iran
- Province: Kohgiluyeh and Boyer-Ahmad
- County: Kohgiluyeh
- Bakhsh: Dishmok
- Rural District: Ajam

Population (2006)
  - Total: 21
- Time zone: UTC+3:30 (IRST)
  - Summer (DST): UTC+4:30 (IRDT)

Darreh Zari-ye Ajam (Persian: دره زري اجم, also Romanized as Darreh Zarī-ye Ājam; also known as Darreh Raẕī) is a village in Ajam Rural District, Dishmok District, Kohgiluyeh County, Kohgiluyeh and Boyer-Ahmad Province, Iran. At the 2006 census, its population was 21, in 4 families.
