= Tang Asiab-e Ajam =

Tang Asiab-e Ajam تنگ اسياب اجم
- Village
- Location within Iran
- Coordinates: 31°11′01″N 50°45′07″E
- Country: Iran
- Province: Kohgiluyeh and Boyer-Ahmad
- County: Kohgiluyeh
- Bakhsh: Dishmok
- Rural District: Ajam

Population (2006)
  - Total: 26
- Time zone: UTC+3:30 (IRST)
  - Summer (DST): UTC+4:30 (IRDT)

Tang Asiab-e Ajam (Persian: تنگ اسياب اجم, also Romanized as Tang Āsīāb-e Ājam; also known as Tang Āsīāb) is a village in Ajam Rural District, Dishmok District, Kohgiluyeh County, Kohgiluyeh and Boyer-Ahmad Province, Iran. At the 2006 census, its population was 26, in 5 families.
