= Sar Par, Kohgiluyeh and Boyer-Ahmad =

Sar Par سرپر
- Village
- Location within Iran
- Coordinates: 31°18′01″N 50°18′10″E
- Country: Iran
- Province: Kohgiluyeh and Boyer-Ahmad
- County: Kohgiluyeh
- Bakhsh: Dishmok
- Rural District: Bahmayi-ye Sarhadi-ye Gharbi

Population (2006)
  - Total: 240
- Time zone: UTC+3:30 (IRST)
  - Summer (DST): UTC+4:30 (IRDT)

Sar Par (Persian: سرپر; also known as Sar Par-e Soflá) is a village in Bahmayi-ye Sarhadi-ye Gharbi Rural District, Dishmok District, Kohgiluyeh County, Kohgiluyeh and Boyer-Ahmad Province, Iran. At the 2006 census, its population was 240, in 35 families.
