= Aqa Ali Penah =

Aqa Ali Penah اقاعلي پناه
- Village
- Country: Iran
- Province: Kohgiluyeh and Boyer-Ahmad
- County: Kohgiluyeh
- Bakhsh: Central
- Rural District: Dehdasht-e Sharqi

Population (2006)
  - Total: 17
- Time zone: UTC+3:30 (IRST)
  - Summer (DST): UTC+4:30 (IRDT)

Aqa Ali Penah (Persian: اقاعلي پناه, also Romanized as Āqā ʿAlī Penāh) is a village in Dehdasht-e Sharqi Rural District, in the Central District of Kohgiluyeh County, Kohgiluyeh and Boyer-Ahmad Province, Iran. At the 2006 census, its population was 17, in 4 families.
