= Balut Bangan =

Balut Bangan بلوطبنگان
- Village
- Location within Iran
- Coordinates: 30°49′53″N 50°24′22″E
- Country: Iran
- Province: Kohgiluyeh and Boyer-Ahmad
- County: Kohgiluyeh
- Bakhsh: Central
- Rural District: Tayebi-ye Garmsiri-ye Jonubi

Population (2006)
  - Total: 222
- Time zone: UTC+3:30 (IRST)
  - Summer (DST): UTC+4:30 (IRDT)

Balut Bangan (Persian: بلوطبنگان, also Romanized as Balūt Bangān, Balūţ Bangān, and Balūţ Bengān) is a village in Tayebi-ye Garmsiri-ye Jonubi Rural District, in the Central District of Kohgiluyeh County, Kohgiluyeh and Boyer-Ahmad Province, Iran. At the 2006 census, its population was 222, in 54 families.
