= Naseh Tavis =

Naseh Tavis نسه طاويس
- Village
- Country: Iran
- Province: Kohgiluyeh and Boyer-Ahmad
- County: Kohgiluyeh
- Bakhsh: Dishmok
- Rural District: Bahmayi-ye Sarhadi-ye Sharqi

Population (2006)
  - Total: 141
- Time zone: UTC+3:30 (IRST)
  - Summer (DST): UTC+4:30 (IRDT)

Naseh Tavis (Persian: نسه طاويس, also Romanized as Naseh Ţāvīs) is a village in Bahmayi-ye Sarhadi-ye Sharqi Rural District, Dishmok District, Kohgiluyeh County, Kohgiluyeh and Boyer-Ahmad Province, Iran. At the 2006 census, its population was 141, in 25 families.
