= Tang-e Gurdalu-ye Dishmuk =

Tang-e Gurdalu-ye Dishmuk تنگ گوردالو ديشموك
- Village
- Country: Iran
- Province: Kohgiluyeh and Boyer-Ahmad
- County: Kohgiluyeh
- Bakhsh: Dishmok
- Rural District: Bahmayi-ye Sarhadi-ye Sharqi

Population (2006)
  - Total: 126
- Time zone: UTC+3:30 (IRST)
  - Summer (DST): UTC+4:30 (IRDT)

Tang-e Gurdalu-ye Dishmuk (Persian: تنگ گوردالو ديشموك, also Romanized as Tang-e Gūrdālū-ye Dīshmūk) is a village in Bahmayi-ye Sarhadi-ye Sharqi Rural District, Dishmok District, Kohgiluyeh County, Kohgiluyeh and Boyer-Ahmad Province, Iran. At the 2006 census, its population was 126, in 22 families.
