= Adrkan =

Adrkan ادركان
- Village
- Location within Iran
- Coordinates: 30°45′24″N 50°37′40″E
- Country: Iran
- Province: Kohgiluyeh and Boyer-Ahmad
- County: Kohgiluyeh
- Bakhsh: Central
- Rural District: Dehdasht-e Sharqi

Population (2006)
  - Total: 313
- Time zone: UTC+3:30 (IRST)
  - Summer (DST): UTC+4:30 (IRDT)

Adrkan (Persian: ادركان, also Romanized as Ādrkān; also known as Dam Maḩd-e Adrmakān) is a village in Dehdasht-e Sharqi Rural District, in the Central District of Kohgiluyeh County, Kohgiluyeh and Boyer-Ahmad Province, Iran. At the 2006 census, its population was 313, in 55 families.
