= Rak, Iran =

Village in Kohgiluyeh and Boyer-Ahmad province, Iran

Rak Persian: راك
- Village
- Location within Iran
- Coordinates: 30°53′41″N 50°30′44″E
- Country: Iran
- Province: Kohgiluyeh and Boyer-Ahmad
- County: Kohgiluyeh
- District: Suq
- Rural District: Rak

Population (2016)
  - Total: 1,848
- Time zone: UTC+3:30 (IRST)

Rak (Persian: راك) (Note: Also romanized as Rāk) is a village in, and the capital of, Rak Rural District of Suq District, Kohgiluyeh County, Kohgiluyeh and Boyer-Ahmad province, Iran.

== Demographics ==
=== Population ===
At the time of the 2006 National Census, the village's population was 1,779 in 323 households, when it was in the Central District. The following census in 2011 counted 1,955 people in 416 households. The 2016 census measured the population of the village as 1,848 people in 445 households, by which time the rural district had been separated from the district in the formation of Suq District. It was the most populous village in its rural district.

== Notable people ==
Iranian Cleric Mohammad Mohad is from here.
