= Mirza Khani =

Mirza Khani ميرزاخاني
- Village
- Location within Iran
- Coordinates: 30°54′30″N 50°19′52″E
- Country: Iran
- Province: Kohgiluyeh and Boyer-Ahmad
- County: Kohgiluyeh
- Bakhsh: Central
- Rural District: Tayebi-ye Garmsiri-ye Jonubi

Population (2006)
  - Total: 29
- Time zone: UTC+3:30 (IRST)
  - Summer (DST): UTC+4:30 (IRDT)

Mirza Khani (Persian: ميرزاخاني, also Romanized as Mīrzā Khānī; also known as Mīrzā Khūnī) is a village in Tayebi-ye Garmsiri-ye Jonubi Rural District, in the Central District of Kohgiluyeh County, Kohgiluyeh and Boyer-Ahmad Province, Iran. At the 2006 census, its population was 29, in 6 families.
