= Ba Qala Dun =

Ba Qala Dun باقلادون
- Village
- Location within Iran
- Coordinates: 31°15′34″N 50°21′41″E
- Country: Iran
- Province: Kohgiluyeh and Boyer-Ahmad
- County: Kohgiluyeh
- Bakhsh: Dishmok
- Rural District: Bahmayi-ye Sarhadi-ye Sharqi

Population (2006)
  - Total: 231
- Time zone: UTC+3:30 (IRST)
  - Summer (DST): UTC+4:30 (IRDT)

Ba Qala Dun (Persian: باقلادون, also Romanized as Bā Qalā Dūn; also known as Bā Qaleh Dān) is a village in Bahmayi-ye Sarhadi-ye Sharqi Rural District, Dishmok District, Kohgiluyeh County, Kohgiluyeh and Boyer-Ahmad Province, Iran. At the 2006 census, its population was 231, in 52 families.
