= Doband-e Sar Mast Dammahad =

Doband-e Sar Mast Dammahad دوبندسرمست دم مهد
- Village
- Location within Iran
- Coordinates: 30°42′42″N 50°38′30″E
- Country: Iran
- Province: Kohgiluyeh and Boyer-Ahmad
- County: Kohgiluyeh
- Bakhsh: Central
- Rural District: Dehdasht-e Sharqi

Population (2006)
  - Total: 66
- Time zone: UTC+3:30 (IRST)
  - Summer (DST): UTC+4:30 (IRDT)

Doband-e Sar Mast Dammahad (Persian: دوبندسرمست دم مهد; also known as Doband) is a village in Dehdasht-e Sharqi Rural District, in the Central District of Kohgiluyeh County, Kohgiluyeh and Boyer-Ahmad Province, Iran. At the 2006 census, its population was 66, in 12 families.
