= Kal Qeysari-ye Olya =

Kal Qeysari-ye Olya كل قيصري عليا
- Village
- Country: Iran
- Province: Kohgiluyeh and Boyer-Ahmad
- County: Kohgiluyeh
- Bakhsh: Central
- Rural District: Rak

Population (2006)
  - Total: 37
- Time zone: UTC+3:30 (IRST)
  - Summer (DST): UTC+4:30 (IRDT)

Kal Qeysari-ye Olya (Persian: كل قيصري عليا, also Romanized as Kal Qeyṣarī-ye ‘Olyā) is a village in Rak Rural District, in the Central District of Kohgiluyeh County, Kohgiluyeh and Boyer-Ahmad Province, Iran. At the 2006 census, its population was 37, in 6 families.
