= Tuf Kheymeh =

Tuf Kheymeh طوف خيمه
- Village
- Location within Iran
- Coordinates: 30°54′29″N 50°23′14″E
- Country: Iran
- Province: Kohgiluyeh and Boyer-Ahmad
- County: Kohgiluyeh
- Bakhsh: Central
- Rural District: Tayebi-ye Garmsiri-ye Jonubi

Population (2006)
  - Total: 43
- Time zone: UTC+3:30 (IRST)
  - Summer (DST): UTC+4:30 (IRDT)

Tuf Kheymeh (Persian: طوف خيمه, also Romanized as Ţūf Kheymeh) is a village in Tayebi-ye Garmsiri-ye Jonubi Rural District, in the Central District of Kohgiluyeh County, Kohgiluyeh and Boyer-Ahmad Province, Iran. At the 2006 census, its population was 43, in 9 families.
