= Kalgeh Zari =

Kalgeh Zari كلگه زري
- Village
- Location within Iran
- Coordinates: 30°52′29″N 50°21′23″E
- Country: Iran
- Province: Kohgiluyeh and Boyer-Ahmad
- County: Kohgiluyeh
- Bakhsh: Central
- Rural District: Tayebi-ye Garmsiri-ye Jonubi

Population (2006)
  - Total: 28
- Time zone: UTC+3:30 (IRST)
  - Summer (DST): UTC+4:30 (IRDT)

Kalgeh Zari (Persian: كلگه زري, also Romanized as Kalgeh Zarī and Kal Geh Zarī) is a village in Tayebi-ye Garmsiri-ye Jonubi Rural District, in the Central District of Kohgiluyeh County, Kohgiluyeh and Boyer-Ahmad Province, Iran. At the 2006 census, its population was 28, in 7 families.
