= La Espid Seyyed Fakhr =

La Espid Seyyed Fakhr لااسپيدسيدفاخر
- Village
- Country: Iran
- Province: Kohgiluyeh and Boyer-Ahmad
- County: Kohgiluyeh
- Bakhsh: Central
- Rural District: Dehdasht-e Gharbi

Population (2006)
  - Total: 17
- Time zone: UTC+3:30 (IRST)
  - Summer (DST): UTC+4:30 (IRDT)

La Espid Seyyed Fakhr (Persian: لااسپيدسيدفاخر, also Romanized as Lā Espīd Seyyed Fākhr) is a village in Dehdasht-e Gharbi Rural District, in the Central District of Kohgiluyeh County, Kohgiluyeh and Boyer-Ahmad Province, Iran. At the 2006 census, its population was 17, in 5 families.
