= Laveh Pay Tall =

Laveh Pay Tall لاوه پاتل
- Village
- Location within Iran
- Coordinates: 31°15′00″N 50°22′02″E
- Country: Iran
- Province: Kohgiluyeh and Boyer-Ahmad
- County: Kohgiluyeh
- Bakhsh: Dishmok
- Rural District: Bahmayi-ye Sarhadi-ye Sharqi

Population (2006)
  - Total: 275
- Time zone: UTC+3:30 (IRST)
  - Summer (DST): UTC+4:30 (IRDT)

Laveh Pay Tall (Persian: لاوه پاتل, also Romanized as Lāveh Pāy Tall) is a village in Bahmayi-ye Sarhadi-ye Sharqi Rural District, Dishmok District, Kohgiluyeh County, Kohgiluyeh and Boyer-Ahmad Province, Iran. At the 2006 census, its population was 275, in 50 families.
