= Rud Sameh =

Rud Sameh رودسمه
- Village
- Location within Iran
- Coordinates: 31°18′48″N 50°16′26″E
- Country: Iran
- Province: Kohgiluyeh and Boyer-Ahmad
- County: Kohgiluyeh
- Bakhsh: Dishmok
- Rural District: Bahmayi-ye Sarhadi-ye Gharbi

Population (2006)
  - Total: 191
- Time zone: UTC+3:30 (IRST)
  - Summer (DST): UTC+4:30 (IRDT)

Rud Sameh (Persian: رودسمه, also Romanized as Rūd Sameh, Rūd-e Semeh, and Rūd Semeh) is a village in Bahmayi-ye Sarhadi-ye Gharbi Rural District, Dishmok District, Kohgiluyeh County, Kohgiluyeh and Boyer-Ahmad Province, Iran. At the 2006 census, its population was 191, in 30 families.
