= Ab Mu =

Ab Mu or Ab Mow or Abmu (Persian: ابمو) may refer to:

- Ab Mu-ye Olya
- Ab Mu-ye Sofla
