= Lir Tahrak =

Lir Tahrak ليرتحرك
- Village
- Location within Iran
- Coordinates: 30°48′42″N 50°39′43″E
- Country: Iran
- Province: Kohgiluyeh and Boyer-Ahmad
- County: Kohgiluyeh
- Bakhsh: Central
- Rural District: Dehdasht-e Sharqi

Population (2006)
  - Total: 639
- Time zone: UTC+3:30 (IRST)
  - Summer (DST): UTC+4:30 (IRDT)

Lir Tahrak (Persian: ليرتحرك, also Romanized as Līr Taḩrak; also known as Līr Tarak and Līr Tork) is a village in Dehdasht-e Sharqi Rural District, in the Central District of Kohgiluyeh County, Kohgiluyeh and Boyer-Ahmad Province, Iran. At the 2006 census, its population was 639, in 119 families.
