= Naseh Talkhah-e Zarguruk-e Olya =

Naseh Talkhah-e Zarguruk-e Olya نسه تلخه زارگوروك عليا
- Village
- Country: Iran
- Province: Kohgiluyeh and Boyer-Ahmad
- County: Kohgiluyeh
- Bakhsh: Dishmok
- Rural District: Bahmayi-ye Sarhadi-ye Sharqi

Population (2006)
  - Total: 24
- Time zone: UTC+3:30 (IRST)
  - Summer (DST): UTC+4:30 (IRDT)

Naseh Talkhah-e Zarguruk-e Olya (Persian: نسه تلخه زارگوروك عليا, also Romanized as Naseh Talkhah-e Zārgūrūk-e ‘Olyā) is a village in Bahmayi-ye Sarhadi-ye Sharqi Rural District, Dishmok District, Kohgiluyeh County, Kohgiluyeh and Boyer-Ahmad Province, Iran. At the 2006 census, its population was 24, in 5 families.
