= Sardow =

Sardow (Persian: سردو) may refer to:

- Sardow-ye Olya
- Sardow-ye Sofla
