= Lirab, Kohgiluyeh =

Village in Kohgiluyeh and Boyer-Ahmad province, Iran

Lirab Persian: ليراب
- Village
- Location within Iran
- Coordinates: 31°22′35″N 50°21′19″E
- Country: Iran
- Province: Kohgiluyeh and Boyer-Ahmad
- County: Kohgiluyeh
- District: Dishmuk
- Rural District: Bahmayi-ye Sarhadi-ye Sharqi

Population (2016)
  - Total: 555
- Time zone: UTC+3:30 (IRST)

Lirab (Persian: ليراب) (Note: Also romanized as Līrāb; also known as Tang-i-Līrab) is a village in Bahmayi-ye Sarhadi-ye Sharqi Rural District of Dishmuk District, Kohgiluyeh County, Kohgiluyeh and Boyer-Ahmad province, Iran.

== Demographics ==
=== Population ===
At the time of the 2006 National Census, the village's population was 575 in 100 households. The following census in 2011 counted 536 people in 109 households. The 2016 census measured the population of the village as 555 people in 123 households. It was the most populous village in its rural district.
