= Naseh Talkhah-e Zarguruk =

Naseh Talkhah-e Zarguruk (Persian: نسه تلخه زارگوروك) may refer to:

- Naseh Talkhah-e Zarguruk-e Olya
- Naseh Talkhah-e Zarguruk-e Sofla
