= Lird =

Lird (Persian: ليرد) may refer to:

- Lird, Gilan
- Lird, alternate name of Poshteh Hir, Gilan Province
- Lird, Hormozgan
