= Sarbas =

Sarbas (Persian: سربس) may refer to:

- Sarbas-e Olya
- Sarbas-e Sofla
