= Kursay Pirzal =

Kursay Pirzal كورساي پيرزال
- Village
- Location within Iran
- Coordinates: 30°49′54″N 50°42′17″E
- Country: Iran
- Province: Kohgiluyeh and Boyer-Ahmad
- County: Kohgiluyeh
- Bakhsh: Central
- Rural District: Dehdasht-e Sharqi

Population (2006)
  - Total: 268
- Time zone: UTC+3:30 (IRST)
  - Summer (DST): UTC+4:30 (IRDT)

Kursay Pirzal (Persian: كورساي پيرزال, also Romanized as Kūrsāy Pīrzāl; also known as Kūrsā) is a village in Dehdasht-e Sharqi Rural District, in the Central District of Kohgiluyeh County, Kohgiluyeh and Boyer-Ahmad Province, Iran. At the 2006 census, its population was 268, in 51 families.
