= Qaleh Dokhtar, Kohgiluyeh and Boyer-Ahmad =

Village in Kohgiluyeh and Boyer-Ahmad province, Iran

Qaleh Dokhtar Persian: قلعه دختر
- Village
- Location within Iran
- Coordinates: 30°58′53″N 50°34′13″E
- Country: Iran
- Province: Kohgiluyeh and Boyer-Ahmad
- County: Kohgiluyeh
- District: Central
- Rural District: Doshman Ziari

Population (2016)
  - Total: 430
- Time zone: UTC+3:30 (IRST)

Qaleh Dokhtar (Persian: قلعه دختر) (Note: Also romanized as Qal‘eh Dokhtar and Qal‘eh-ye Dokhtar; also known as Sar Dasht) is a village in, and the capital of, Doshman Ziari Rural District of the Central District of Kohgiluyeh County, Kohgiluyeh and Boyer-Ahmad province, Iran.

== Demographics ==
=== Population ===
At the time of the 2006 National Census, the village's population was 495 in 100 households. The following census in 2011 counted 467 people in 123 households. The 2016 census measured the population of the village as 430 people in 119 households.
