= Kelayeh-ye Vosta =

Kelayeh-ye Vosta كلايه وسطي
- Village
- Location within Iran
- Coordinates: 30°49′21″N 50°40′19″E
- Country: Iran
- Province: Kohgiluyeh and Boyer-Ahmad
- County: Kohgiluyeh
- Bakhsh: Central
- Rural District: Dehdasht-e Sharqi

Population (2006)
  - Total: 61
- Time zone: UTC+3:30 (IRST)
  - Summer (DST): UTC+4:30 (IRDT)

Kelayeh-ye Vosta (Persian: كلايه وسطي, also Romanized as Kelāyeh-ye Vosţá) is a village in Dehdasht-e Sharqi Rural District, in the Central District of Kohgiluyeh County, Kohgiluyeh and Boyer-Ahmad Province, Iran. At the 2006 census, its population was 61, in 11 families.
