= Changalva =

Village in Kohgiluyeh and Boyer-Ahmad province, Iran

Changalva Persian: چنگلوا
- Village
- Location within Iran
- Coordinates: 30°48′24″N 50°28′44″E
- Country: Iran
- Province: Kohgiluyeh and Boyer-Ahmad
- County: Kohgiluyeh
- District: Central
- Rural District: Dehdasht-e Gharbi

Population (2016)
  - Total: 1,567
- Time zone: UTC+3:30 (IRST)

Changalva (Persian: چنگلوا) (Note: Also romanized as Changalvā; also known as Chungīlu, Chungilwa, Qal‘eh-i-Changalābād, Qal‘eh-ye Changalābād, Sanqorābād, and Sonqorābād) is a village in Dehdasht-e Gharbi Rural District of the Central District of Kohgiluyeh County, Kohgiluyeh and Boyer-Ahmad province, Iran.

== Demographics ==
=== Population ===
At the time of the 2006 National Census, the village's population was 1,505 in 262 households. The following census in 2011 counted 1,656 people in 340 households. The 2016 census measured the population of the village as 1,567 people in 377 households. It was the most populous village in its rural district.
