= Deh Chol =

Deh Chol or Deh-e Chol (Persian: ده چل) may refer to:

- Deh Chol-e Ka Abdel
- Deh-e Chol-e Delita
