= Darreh Geru-ye Olya =

Village in Kohgiluyeh and Boyer-Ahmad, Iran

Darreh Geru-ye Olya دره گروعليا
- Village
- Location within Iran
- Coordinates: 31°14′20″N 50°23′02″E
- Country: Iran
- Province: Kohgiluyeh and Boyer-Ahmad
- County: Kohgiluyeh
- Bakhsh: Dishmok
- Rural District: Bahmayi-ye Sarhadi-ye Sharqi

Population (2006)
  - Total: 205
- Time zone: UTC+3:30 (IRST)
  - Summer (DST): UTC+4:30 (IRDT)

Darreh Geru-ye Olya (Persian: دره گروعليا, also Romanized as Darreh Gerū-ye ‘Olyā; also known as Darreh Gerūh Bālā, Darreh Gerū-ye Bālā, and Darreh Gorūh ‘Olyā) is a village in Bahmayi-ye Sarhadi-ye Sharqi Rural District, Dishmok District, Kohgiluyeh County, Kohgiluyeh and Boyer-Ahmad Province, Iran. At the 2006 census, its population was 205, in 39 families.
