= Sar-e Mahur =

Village in Kohgiluyeh and Boyer-Ahmad province, Iran

Sar-e Mahur Persian: سرماهور
- Village
- Location within Iran
- Coordinates: 30°41′19″N 50°31′26″E
- Country: Iran
- Province: Kohgiluyeh and Boyer-Ahmad
- County: Kohgiluyeh
- District: Central
- Rural District: Dehdasht-e Gharbi

Population (2016)
  - Total: 65
- Time zone: UTC+3:30 (IRST)

Sar-e Mahur (Persian: سرماهور) (Note: Also romanized as Sar-e Māhūr; also known as Sar Mūr) is a village in, and the capital of, Dehdasht-e Gharbi Rural District of the Central District of Kohgiluyeh County, Kohgiluyeh and Boyer-Ahmad province, Iran.

== Demographics ==
=== Population ===
At the time of the 2006 National Census, the village's population was 114 in 23 households. The following census in 2011 counted 79 people in 19 households. The 2016 census measured the population of the village as 65 people in 19 households.
