= Ab Mu-ye Olya =

Ab Mu-ye Olya ابموعليا
- Village
- Location within Iran
- Coordinates: 30°52′08″N 50°22′42″E
- Country: Iran
- Province: Kohgiluyeh and Boyer-Ahmad
- County: Kohgiluyeh
- Bakhsh: Central
- Rural District: Tayebi-ye Garmsiri-ye Jonubi

Population (2006)
  - Total: 18
- Time zone: UTC+3:30 (IRST)
  - Summer (DST): UTC+4:30 (IRDT)

Ab Mu-ye Olya (Persian: ابموعليا, also Romanized as Āb Mū-ye 'Olyā and Ābmū 'Olyā; also known as Āb Mow) is a village in Tayebi-ye Garmsiri-ye Jonubi Rural District, in the Central District of Kohgiluyeh County, Kohgiluyeh and Boyer-Ahmad province, Iran.

== Census ==
According to the 2006 census, it had a population of 18 in 7 families.
