= Zirnay-e Sofla =

Zirnay-e Sofla زيرناي سفلي
- Village
- Location within Iran
- Coordinates: 31°01′45″N 50°38′40″E
- Country: Iran
- Province: Kohgiluyeh and Boyer-Ahmad
- County: Kohgiluyeh
- Bakhsh: Central
- Rural District: Doshman Ziari

Population (2006)
  - Total: 79
- Time zone: UTC+3:30 (IRST)
  - Summer (DST): UTC+4:30 (IRDT)

Zirnay-e Sofla (Persian: زيرناي سفلي, also Romanized as Zīrnāy-e ‘Soflá; also known as Zīrnā-e Soflá) is a village in Doshman Ziari Rural District, in the Central District of Kohgiluyeh County, Kohgiluyeh and Boyer-Ahmad Province, Iran. At the 2006 census, its population was 79, in 12 families.
