= Suq (disambiguation) =

A suq or souk is a bazaar.

Suq or SUQ may also refer to:

- Suq, Iran, in Kohgiluyeh and Boyer-Ahmad province
  - Suq District
- Suq, Yemen, on the island of Socotra
- Sucúa Airport, Ecuador, IATA airport code SUQ
- Su' language, or Suq, spoken in Laos

== See also ==
- Souq (company)
- Shuk, Iran
