= Lir-e Kuchek =

Lir-e Kuchek ليركوچك
- Village
- Location within Iran
- Coordinates: 30°54′25″N 50°26′16″E
- Country: Iran
- Province: Kohgiluyeh and Boyer-Ahmad
- County: Kohgiluyeh
- Bakhsh: Central
- Rural District: Tayebi-ye Garmsiri-ye Jonubi

Population (2006)
  - Total: 118
- Time zone: UTC+3:30 (IRST)
  - Summer (DST): UTC+4:30 (IRDT)

Lir-e Kuchek (Persian: ليركوچك, also Romanized as Līr-e Kūchek and Lir Koochak; also known as Līr) is a village in Tayebi-ye Garmsiri-ye Jonubi Rural District, in the Central District of Kohgiluyeh County, Kohgiluyeh and Boyer-Ahmad Province, Iran. At the 2006 census, its population was 118, in 24 families.
