= Deh Chol-e Ka Abdel =

Deh Chol-e Ka Abdel ده چل كاعبدل
- Village
- Country: Iran
- Province: Kohgiluyeh and Boyer-Ahmad
- County: Kohgiluyeh
- Bakhsh: Central
- Rural District: Rak

Population (2006)
  - Total: 62
- Time zone: UTC+3:30 (IRST)
  - Summer (DST): UTC+4:30 (IRDT)

Deh Chol-e Ka Abdel (Persian: ده چل كاعبدل, also Romanized as Deh Chol-e Kā ʿAbdel) is a village in Rak Rural District, in the Central District of Kohgiluyeh County, Kohgiluyeh and Boyer-Ahmad Province, Iran. At the 2006 census, its population was 62, in 10 families.
