= Rud Rish =

Village in Kohgiluyeh and Boyer-Ahmad province, Iran

Rud Rish Persian: رودريش
- Village
- Location within Iran
- Coordinates: 31°18′54″N 50°35′46″E
- Country: Iran
- Province: Kohgiluyeh and Boyer-Ahmad
- County: Kohgiluyeh
- District: Dishmuk
- Rural District: Ajam

Population (2016)
  - Total: 256
- Time zone: UTC+3:30 (IRST)

Rud Rish (Persian: رودريش) (Note: Also romanized as Rūd Rīsh and Rūd-e Rīsh; also known as Rūrīsh) is a village in Ajam Rural District of Dishmuk District, Kohgiluyeh County, Kohgiluyeh and Boyer-Ahmad province, Iran.

== Demographics ==
=== Population ===
At the time of the 2006 National Census, the village's population was 290 in 52 households. The following census in 2011 counted 21 people in 4 households. The 2016 census measured the population of the village as 256 people in 56 households. It was the most populous village in its rural district.
