= Zirnay =

Zirnay (Persian: زيرناي), also rendered as Zirna, may refer to:

- Zirnay-e Olya
- Zirnay-e Sofla
