= Esfandan, Kohgiluyeh and Boyer-Ahmad =

Village in Kohgiluyeh and Boyer-Ahmad province, Iran

Esfandan Persian: اسفندان
- Village
- Location within Iran
- Coordinates: 31°16′55″N 50°17′15″E
- Country: Iran
- Province: Kohgiluyeh and Boyer-Ahmad
- County: Kohgiluyeh
- District: Dishmuk
- Rural District: Bahmayi-ye Sarhadi-ye Gharbi

Population (2016)
  - Total: 952
- Time zone: UTC+3:30 (IRST)

Esfandan (Persian: اسفندان) (Note: Also romanized as Esfandān; also known as Estandān) is a village in, and the capital of, Bahmayi-ye Sarhadi-ye Gharbi Rural District of Dishmuk District, Kohgiluyeh County, Kohgiluyeh and Boyer-Ahmad province, Iran.

== Demographics ==
=== Population ===
At the time of the 2006 National Census, the village's population was 976 in 194 households. The following census in 2011 counted 953 people in 185 households. The 2016 census measured the population of the village as 952 people in 214 households.
