= Talkheh Zar-e Olya =

Talkheh Zar-e Olya تلخه زارعليا
- Village
- Location within Iran
- Coordinates: 31°14′49″N 50°43′59″E
- Country: Iran
- Province: Kohgiluyeh and Boyer-Ahmad
- County: Kohgiluyeh
- Bakhsh: Dishmok
- Rural District: Bahmayi-ye Sarhadi-ye Sharqi

Population (2006)
  - Total: 62
- Time zone: UTC+3:30 (IRST)
  - Summer (DST): UTC+4:30 (IRDT)

Talkheh Zar-e Olya (Persian: تلخه زارعليا, also Romanized as Talkheh Zār-e ‘Olyā) is a village in Bahmayi-ye Sarhadi-ye Sharqi Rural District, Dishmok District, Kohgiluyeh County, Kohgiluyeh and Boyer-Ahmad Province, Iran. At the 2006 census, its population was 62, in 13 families.
