= Zarghamabad, Kohgiluyeh and Boyer-Ahmad =

Village in Kohgiluyeh and Boyer-Ahmad province, Iran

Zarghamabad Persian: ضرغام اباد
- Village
- Location within Iran
- Coordinates: 30°35′16″N 50°41′57″E
- Country: Iran
- Province: Kohgiluyeh and Boyer-Ahmad
- County: Kohgiluyeh
- District: Central
- Rural District: Dehdasht-e Sharqi

Population (2016)
  - Total: 821
- Time zone: UTC+3:30 (IRST)

Zarghamabad (Persian: ضرغام اباد) (Note: Also romanized as Ẕarghāmābād) is a village in, and the capital of, Dehdasht-e Sharqi Rural District of the Central District of Kohgiluyeh County, Kohgiluyeh and Boyer-Ahmad province, Iran.

== Demographics ==
=== Population ===
At the time of the 2006 National Census, the village's population was 961 in 173 households. The following census in 2011 counted 890 people in 182 households. The 2016 census measured the population of the village as 821 people in 215 households.
