= Pataveh-ye Rud Sameh =

Pataveh-ye Rud Sameh پاطاوه رودسمه
- Village
- Location within Iran
- Coordinates: 31°04′01″N 50°32′49″E
- Country: Iran
- Province: Kohgiluyeh and Boyer-Ahmad
- County: Kohgiluyeh
- Bakhsh: Dishmok
- Rural District: Bahmayi-ye Sarhadi-ye Gharbi

Population (2006)
  - Total: 92
- Time zone: UTC+3:30 (IRST)
  - Summer (DST): UTC+4:30 (IRDT)

Pataveh-ye Rud Sameh (Persian: پاطاوه رودسمه, also Romanized as Pāţāveh-ye Rūd Sameh; also known as Pāţāveh) is a village in Bahmayi-ye Sarhadi-ye Gharbi Rural District, Dishmok District, Kohgiluyeh County, Kohgiluyeh and Boyer-Ahmad Province, Iran. At the 2006 census, its population was 92, in 16 families.
