= Ab Mu-ye Sofla =

Ab Mu-ye Sofla ابموسفلي
- Village
- Location within Iran
- Coordinates: 30°50′54″N 50°25′23″E
- Country: Iran
- Province: Kohgiluyeh and Boyer-Ahmad
- County: Kohgiluyeh
- Bakhsh: Central
- Rural District: Tayebi-ye Garmsiri-ye Jonubi

Population (2006)
  - Total: 38
- Time zone: UTC+3:30 (IRST)
  - Summer (DST): UTC+4:30 (IRDT)

Ab Mu-ye Sofla (Persian: ابموسفلي, also Romanized as Āb Mū-ye Soflá; also known as Āb Mow and Ābmū Soflá) is a village in Tayebi-ye Garmsiri-ye Jonubi Rural District, in the Central District of Kohgiluyeh County, Kohgiluyeh and Boyer-Ahmad province, Iran. At the 2006 census, its population was 38, in 9 families.
