= Lir-e Bozorg =

Village in Kohgiluyeh and Boyer-Ahmad province, Iran

Lir-e Bozorg Persian: ليربزرگ
- Village
- Location within Iran
- Coordinates: 30°53′43″N 50°26′37″E
- Country: Iran
- Province: Kohgiluyeh and Boyer-Ahmad
- County: Kohgiluyeh
- District: Suq
- Rural District: Tayebi-ye Garmsiri-ye Jonubi

Population (2016)
  - Total: 196
- Time zone: UTC+3:30 (IRST)

Lir-e Bozorg (Persian: ليربزرگ) (Note: Also romanized as Līr-e Bozorg) is a village in Tayebi-ye Garmsiri-ye Jonubi Rural District of Suq District, Kohgiluyeh County, Kohgiluyeh and Boyer-Ahmad province, Iran.

== Demographics ==
=== Population ===
At the time of the 2006 National Census, the village's population was 176 in 37 households, when it was in the Central District. The following census in 2011 counted 153 people in 34 households. The 2016 census measured the population of the village as 196 people in 56 households, by which time the rural district had been separated from the district in the formation of Suq District. It was the most populous village in its rural district.
