= Darreh Geru-ye Sofla =

Village in Kohgiluyeh and Boyer-Ahmad, Iran

Darreh Geru-ye Sofla دره گروسفلي
- Village
- Location within Iran
- Coordinates: 31°14′25″N 50°22′45″E
- Country: Iran
- Province: Kohgiluyeh and Boyer-Ahmad
- County: Kohgiluyeh
- Bakhsh: Dishmok
- Rural District: Bahmayi-ye Sarhadi-ye Sharqi

Population (2006)
  - Total: 408
- Time zone: UTC+3:30 (IRST)
  - Summer (DST): UTC+4:30 (IRDT)

Darreh Geru-ye Sofla (Persian: دره گروسفلي, also Romanized as Darreh Gerū-ye Soflá; also known as Darreh Gerow-ye Pā’īn, Darreh Gerūh Pā’īn, Darreh Gerū-ye Pā’īn, and Darreh Gorūh Soflá) is a village in Bahmayi-ye Sarhadi-ye Sharqi Rural District, Dishmok District, Kohgiluyeh County, Kohgiluyeh and Boyer-Ahmad Province, Iran. At the 2006 census, its population was 408, in 80 families.
