= Sardow-ye Olya =

Sardow-ye Olya سردوعليا
- Village
- Location within Iran
- Coordinates: 31°17′23″N 50°13′14″E
- Country: Iran
- Province: Kohgiluyeh and Boyer-Ahmad
- County: Kohgiluyeh
- Bakhsh: Dishmok
- Rural District: Bahmayi-ye Sarhadi-ye Gharbi

Population (2006)
  - Total: 399
- Time zone: UTC+3:30 (IRST)
  - Summer (DST): UTC+4:30 (IRDT)

Sardow-ye Olya (Persian: سردوعليا, also Romanized as Srdow-ye ‘Olyā) is a village in Bahmayi-ye Sarhadi-ye Gharbi Rural District, Dishmok District, Kohgiluyeh County, Kohgiluyeh and Boyer-Ahmad Province, Iran. At the 2006 census, its population was 399, in 67 families.
