= Kalat, Kohgiluyeh =

Village in Kohgiluyeh and Boyer-Ahmad province, Iran

Kalat Persian: كلات
- Village
- Location within Iran
- Coordinates: 30°58′38″N 50°32′44″E
- Country: Iran
- Province: Kohgiluyeh and Boyer-Ahmad
- County: Kohgiluyeh
- District: Central
- Rural District: Doshman Ziari

Population (2016)
  - Total: 440
- Time zone: UTC+3:30 (IRST)

Kalat (Persian: كلات) (Note: Also romanized as Kalāt) is a village in Doshman Ziari Rural District of the Central District of Kohgiluyeh County, Kohgiluyeh and Boyer-Ahmad province, Iran.

== Demographics ==
=== Population ===
At the time of the 2006 National Census, the village's population was 575 in 120 households. The following census in 2011 counted 484 people in 112 households. The 2016 census measured the population of the village as 440 people in 124 households. It was the most populous village in its rural district.
