= Sar Bisheh-ye Olya =

Sar Bisheh-ye Olya سربيشه عليا
- Village
- Location within Iran
- Coordinates: 31°15′59″N 50°21′09″E
- Country: Iran
- Province: Kohgiluyeh and Boyer-Ahmad
- County: Kohgiluyeh
- Bakhsh: Dishmok
- Rural District: Bahmayi-ye Sarhadi-ye Sharqi

Population (2006)
  - Total: 304
- Time zone: UTC+3:30 (IRST)
  - Summer (DST): UTC+4:30 (IRDT)

Sar Bisheh-ye Olya (Persian: سربيشه عليا, also Romanized as Sar Bīsheh-ye ‘Olyā) is a village in Bahmayi-ye Sarhadi-ye Sharqi Rural District, Dishmok District, Kohgiluyeh County, Kohgiluyeh and Boyer-Ahmad Province, Iran. At the 2006 census, its population was 304, in 61 families.
