= Sar Bisheh-ye Sofla =

Sar Bisheh-ye Sofla سربيشه سفلي
- Village
- Location within Iran
- Coordinates: 31°16′04″N 50°20′35″E
- Country: Iran
- Province: Kohgiluyeh and Boyer-Ahmad
- County: Kohgiluyeh
- Bakhsh: Dishmok
- Rural District: Bahmayi-ye Sarhadi-ye Gharbi

Population (2006)
  - Total: 139
- Time zone: UTC+3:30 (IRST)
  - Summer (DST): UTC+4:30 (IRDT)

Sar Bisheh-ye Sofla (Persian: سربيشه سفلي, also Romanized as Sar Bīsheh-ye Soflá) is a village in Bahmayi-ye Sarhadi-ye Gharbi Rural District, Dishmok District, Kohgiluyeh County, Kohgiluyeh and Boyer-Ahmad Province, Iran. At the 2006 census, its population was 139, in 28 families.
