= Bahmayi-ye Sarhadi =

Bahmayi-ye Sarhadi (Persian: بهمئي سرحدئ) may refer to:

- Bahmayi-ye Sarhadi-ye Gharbi Rural District
- Bahmayi-ye Sarhadi-ye Sharqi Rural District
