= Jahan Bakhsh, Kohgiluyeh and Boyer-Ahmad =

Jahan Bakhsh جهانبخش
- Village
- Location within Iran
- Coordinates: 30°59′36″N 50°33′20″E
- Country: Iran
- Province: Kohgiluyeh and Boyer-Ahmad
- County: Kohgiluyeh
- Bakhsh: Central
- Rural District: Doshman Ziari

Population (2006)
  - Total: 22
- Time zone: UTC+3:30 (IRST)
  - Summer (DST): UTC+4:30 (IRDT)

Jahan Bakhsh (Persian: جهانبخش, also Romanized as Jahān Bakhsh) is a village in Doshman Ziari Rural District, in the Central District of Kohgiluyeh County, Kohgiluyeh and Boyer-Ahmad Province, Iran. At the 2006 census, its population was 22, in 5 families.
