= Darghak =

Village in Kohgiluyeh and Boyer-Ahmad province, Iran

Darghak Persian: درغك
- Village
- Location within Iran
- Coordinates: 31°13′11″N 50°20′47″E
- Country: Iran
- Province: Kohgiluyeh and Boyer-Ahmad
- County: Kohgiluyeh
- District: Dishmuk
- Rural District: Bahmayi-ye Sarhadi-ye Gharbi

Population (2016)
  - Total: 1,222
- Time zone: UTC+3:30 (IRST)

Darghak (Persian: درغك) (Note: Also romanized as Dorghak; also known as Darghak-e Pā’īn) is a village in Bahmayi-ye Sarhadi-ye Gharbi Rural District of Dishmuk District, Kohgiluyeh County, Kohgiluyeh and Boyer-Ahmad province, Iran. The village is separated into two parts, Darghak-e Pā’īn and Darghak-e Bā’lā’, by a valley whose name is Daray-e Dā’rghak. Gelim Mosh'teh, a kind of rug, is a handicraft found only in this village.

== Demographics ==
=== Population ===
At the time of the 2006 National Census, the village's population was 1,464 in 260 households. The following census in 2011 counted 1,351 people in 307 households. The 2016 census measured the population of the village as 1,222 people in 292 households. It was the most populous village in its rural district.
