= Pataveh-ye Ajam =

Village in Kohgiluyeh and Boyer-Ahmad province, Iran

Pataveh-ye Ajam Persian: پاتاوه اجم
- Village
- Location within Iran
- Coordinates: 31°17′32″N 50°37′14″E
- Country: Iran
- Province: Kohgiluyeh and Boyer-Ahmad
- County: Kohgiluyeh
- District: Dishmuk
- Rural District: Ajam

Population (2016)
  - Total: 23
- Time zone: UTC+3:30 (IRST)

Pataveh-ye Ajam (Persian: پاتاوه اجم) (Note: Also romanized as Pātāveh Ājam and Pātāveh-ye Ājam) is a village in, and the capital of, Ajam Rural District of Dishmuk District, Kohgiluyeh County, Kohgiluyeh and Boyer-Ahmad province, Iran.

== Demographics ==
=== Population ===
At the time of the 2006 National Census, the village's population was 113 in 19 households. During the following census in 2011, the population was below the reporting threshold. The 2016 census measured the population of the village as 23 people in 5 households.
