= LIRS =

LIRS may refer to:

- Grosseto Airport, an Italian airport ICAO: LIRS
- LIRS caching algorithm
- Lizard Island Research Station, on the Great Barrier Reef, Australia
- Lutheran Immigration and Refugee Service, a non-profit organization now known as Global Refuge

== See also ==
- LIR (disambiguation)
