= Tayebi-ye Garmsiri =

Tayebi-ye Garmsiri (Persian: طيبي گرمسيرئ) may refer to:

- Tayebi-ye Garmsiri-ye Jonubi Rural District
- Tayebi-ye Garmsiri-ye Shomali Rural District
