= Kelayeh-ye Sofla =

Village in Kohgiluyeh and Boyer-Ahmad province, Iran

Kelayeh-ye Sofla Persian: كلايه سفلي
- Village
- Location within Iran
- Coordinates: 30°49′16″N 50°41′07″E
- Country: Iran
- Province: Kohgiluyeh and Boyer-Ahmad
- County: Kohgiluyeh
- District: Central
- Rural District: Dehdasht-e Sharqi

Population (2016)
  - Total: 1,401
- Time zone: UTC+3:30 (IRST)

Kelayeh-ye Sofla (Persian: كلايه سفلي) (Note: Also romanized as Kelāyeh-ye Soflá) is a village in Dehdasht-e Sharqi Rural District of the Central District of Kohgiluyeh County, Kohgiluyeh and Boyer-Ahmad province, Iran.

== Demographics ==
=== Population ===
At the time of the 2006 National Census, the village's population was 1,551 in 267 households. The following census in 2011 counted 1,496 people in 302 households. The 2016 census measured the population of the village as 1,401 people in 360 households. It was the most populous village in its rural district.
