= Kursa =

Kursa may refer to:

- Beta Eridani, a star
- Kursa, Iran, a village
