= Jahan Bakhsh =

Jahan Bakhsh (Persian: جهانبخش) may refer to:

- Jahan Bakhsh, Kohgiluyeh and Boyer-Ahmad
- Jahan Bakhsh, Sistan and Baluchestan
- Alireza Jahanbakhsh, Iranian footballer
