= Pataveh-ye Pey Rah =

Pataveh-ye Pey Rah پاتاوه پي راه
- Village
- Location within Iran
- Coordinates: 31°09′14″N 50°28′47″E
- Country: Iran
- Province: Kohgiluyeh and Boyer-Ahmad
- County: Kohgiluyeh
- Bakhsh: Charusa
- Rural District: Tayebi-ye Sarhadi-ye Sharqi

Population (2006)
  - Total: 202
- Time zone: UTC+3:30 (IRST)
  - Summer (DST): UTC+4:30 (IRDT)

Pataveh-ye Pey Rah (Persian: پاتاوه پي راه; also romanized as Pātāveh-ye Pey Rāh; also known as Pātāveh-ye Soflá) is a village in Tayebi-ye Sarhadi-ye Sharqi Rural District, Charusa District, Kohgiluyeh County, Kohgiluyeh and Boyer-Ahmad Province, Iran. At the 2006 census, its population was 202, in 40 families.
