= Pataveh-ye Charusa =

Pataveh-ye Charusa پاتاوه چاروسا
- Village
- Location within Iran
- Coordinates: 31°08′56″N 50°29′10″E
- Country: Iran
- Province: Kohgiluyeh and Boyer-Ahmad
- County: Kohgiluyeh
- Bakhsh: Charusa
- Rural District: Tayebi-ye Sarhadi-ye Sharqi

Population (2006)
  - Total: 325
- Time zone: UTC+3:30 (IRST)
  - Summer (DST): UTC+4:30 (IRDT)

Pataveh-ye Charusa (Persian: پاتاوه چاروسا, also Romanized as Pātāveh-ye Chārūsā; also known as Pātāveh-ye ‘Olyā) is a village in Tayebi-ye Sarhadi-ye Sharqi Rural District, Charusa District, Kohgiluyeh County, Kohgiluyeh and Boyer-Ahmad Province, Iran. At the 2006 census, its population was 325, in 60 families.
