= Talkheh Zar, Kohgiluyeh =

Talkheh Zar تلخه زار
- Village
- Location within Iran
- Coordinates: 31°15′58″N 50°26′27″E
- Country: Iran
- Province: Kohgiluyeh and Boyer-Ahmad
- County: Kohgiluyeh
- Bakhsh: Charusa
- Rural District: Tayebi-ye Sarhadi-ye Sharqi

Population (2006)
  - Total: 77
- Time zone: UTC+3:30 (IRST)
  - Summer (DST): UTC+4:30 (IRDT)

Talkheh Zar (Persian: تلخه زار, also Romanized as Talkheh Zār; also known as Talkhehzār) is a village in Tayebi-ye Sarhadi-ye Sharqi Rural District, Charusa District, Kohgiluyeh County, Kohgiluyeh and Boyer-Ahmad Province, Iran. At the 2006 census, its population was 77, in 11 families.
