= Dishmuk =

City in Kohgiluyeh and Boyer-Ahmad province, Iran

Dishmuk Persian: دیشموک
- City
- Location within Iran
- Coordinates: 31°17′55″N 50°23′58″E
- Country: Iran
- Province: Kohgiluyeh and Boyer-Ahmad
- County: Kohgiluyeh
- District: Dishmuk

Population (2016)
  - Total: 5,791
- Time zone: UTC+3:30 (IRST)

Dishmuk (Persian: دیشموک) (Note: Also romanized as Dīshmook and Dīshmūk; also known as Dīshmok) is a city in, and the capital of, Dishmuk District of Kohgiluyeh County, Kohgiluyeh and Boyer-Ahmad province, Iran. It also serves as the administrative center for Bahmayi-ye Sarhadi-ye Sharqi Rural District.

== Demographics ==
=== Population ===
At the time of the 2006 National Census, the city's population was 4,053 in 710 households. The following census in 2011 counted 4,875 people in 957 households. The 2016 census measured the population of the city as 5,791 people in 1,294 households.
