= Lir Abi =

Lir Abi or Lirabi (Persian: ليرابي) may refer to:

- Lir Abi, Ardal
- Lir Abi, Lordegan
