= Pay Tavah =

Pay Tavah پاي تاوه
- Village
- Location within Iran
- Coordinates: 27°04′14″N 54°09′06″E
- Country: Iran
- Province: Hormozgan
- County: Bastak
- Bakhsh: Jenah
- Rural District: Jenah

Population (2006)
  - Total: 261
- Time zone: UTC+3:30 (IRST)
  - Summer (DST): UTC+4:30 (IRDT)

Pay Tavah (Persian: پاي تاوه, also Romanized as Pāy Tāvah and Pāy-e Tāveh; also known as Pātāveh) is a village in Jenah Rural District, Jenah District, Bastak County, Hormozgan Province, Iran. At the 2006 census, its population was 261, in 53 families.
