= Poshteh Hir =

Poshteh Hir پشته هير
- Village
- Location within Iran
- Coordinates: 37°55′44″N 48°45′19″E
- Country: Iran
- Province: Gilan
- County: Talesh
- Bakhsh: Central
- Rural District: Kuhestani-ye Talesh

Population (2006)
  - Total: 16
- Time zone: UTC+3:30 (IRST)
  - Summer (DST): UTC+4:30 (IRDT)

Poshteh Hir (Persian: پشته هير, also Romanized as Poshteh Hīr; also known as Līrd) is a village in Kuhestani-ye Talesh Rural District, in the Central District of Talesh County, Gilan Province, Iran. At the 2006 census, its population was 16, in 4 families.
