= Sar Bisheh, Dezful =

Sar Bisheh سربيشه
- Village
- Location within Iran
- Coordinates: 32°18′30″N 48°36′36″E
- Country: Iran
- Province: Khuzestan
- County: Dezful
- Bakhsh: Sardasht
- Rural District: Mahur Berenji

Population (2006)
  - Total: 275
- Time zone: UTC+3:30 (IRST)
  - Summer (DST): UTC+4:30 (IRDT)

Sar Bisheh (Persian: سربيشه, also Romanized as Sar Bīsheh) is a village in Mahur Berenji Rural District, Sardasht District, Dezful County, Khuzestan Province, Iran. At the 2006 census, its population was 275, in 44 families.
