= Pataveh, Susan =

Pataveh پاتوه
- Village
- Location within Iran
- Coordinates: 31°58′58″N 50°03′00″E
- Country: Iran
- Province: Khuzestan
- County: Izeh
- Bakhsh: Susan
- Rural District: Susan-e Sharqi

Population (2006)
  - Total: 172
- Time zone: UTC+3:30 (IRST)
  - Summer (DST): UTC+4:30 (IRDT)

Pataveh (Persian: پاتوه, also Romanized as Pātāveh) is a village in Susan-e Sharqi Rural District, Susan District, Izeh County, Khuzestan Province, Iran. At the 2006 census, its population was 172, in 31 families.
