= Sar Bisheh, Chaharmahal and Bakhtiari =

Sar Bisheh سربيشه
- Village
- Country: Iran
- Province: Chaharmahal and Bakhtiari
- County: Kuhrang
- Bakhsh: Bazoft
- Rural District: Bazoft

Population (2006)
  - Total: 33
- Time zone: UTC+3:30 (IRST)
  - Summer (DST): UTC+4:30 (IRDT)

Sar Bisheh (Persian: سربيشه, also Romanized as Sar Bīsheh) is a village in Bazoft Rural District, Bazoft District, Kuhrang County, Chaharmahal and Bakhtiari Province, Iran. At the 2006 census, its population was 33, in 5 families. The village is populated by Lurs.
