= Lir-e Shamlek =

Lir-e Shamlek ليرشملك
- Village
- Location within Iran
- Coordinates: 31°25′39″N 50°35′34″E
- Country: Iran
- Province: Chaharmahal and Bakhtiari
- County: Lordegan
- Bakhsh: Central
- Rural District: Milas

Population (2006)
  - Total: 31
- Time zone: UTC+3:30 (IRST)
  - Summer (DST): UTC+4:30 (IRDT)

Lir-e Shamlek (Persian: ليرشملك, also Romanized as Līr-e Shamlek; also known as Līr) is a village in Milas Rural District, in the Central District of Lordegan County, Chaharmahal and Bakhtiari Province, Iran. At the 2006 census, its population was 31, in 8 families.
