= Pataveh, Landeh =

Pataveh پاطاوه
- village
- Location within Iran
- Coordinates: 31°00′06″N 50°16′55″E
- Country: Iran
- Province: Kohgiluyeh and Boyer-Ahmad
- County: Landeh
- Bakhsh: Central
- Rural District: Olya Tayeb

Population (2011)
  - Total: 2,314
- Time zone: UTC+3:30 (IRST)
  - Summer (DST): UTC+4:30 (IRDT)
- ISO 3166 code: IRN

Pataveh (Persian: پاطاوه, also Romanized as Pātāveh; also known as Pāy-e Ţāveh) is a village in Olya Tayeb Rural District, in the Central District of Landeh County, Kohgiluyeh and Boyer-Ahmad Province, Iran. At the 2011 census, its population was 2,314.
