= Deh-e Chol-e Delita =

Deh-e Chol-e Delita ده چل دلي تا
- Village
- Location within Iran
- Coordinates: 31°02′41″N 50°34′31″E
- Country: Iran
- Province: Kohgiluyeh and Boyer-Ahmad
- County: Boyer-Ahmad
- Bakhsh: Ludab
- Rural District: Ludab

Population (2006)
  - Total: 55
- Time zone: UTC+3:30 (IRST)
  - Summer (DST): UTC+4:30 (IRDT)

Deh-e Chol-e Delita (Persian: ده چل دلي تا, also romanized as Deh-e Chol-e Delītā; also known as Deh-e Chol) is a village in Ludab Rural District, Ludab District, Boyer-Ahmad County, Kohgiluyeh and Boyer-Ahmad Province, Iran. At the 2006 census, its population was 55, in 9 families.
