= Sar Bisheh, Fars =

Sar Bisheh سربيشه
- Village
- Location within Iran
- Coordinates: 30°12′54″N 51°28′29″E
- Country: Iran
- Province: Fars
- County: Mamasani
- Bakhsh: Central
- Rural District: Fahlian

Population (2006)
  - Total: 78
- Time zone: UTC+3:30 (IRST)
  - Summer (DST): UTC+4:30 (IRDT)

Sar Bisheh (Persian: سربيشه, also Romanized as Sar Bīsheh; also known as Tall-e Bīsheh) is a village in Fahlian Rural District, in the Central District of Mamasani County, Fars province, Iran. At the 2006 census, its population was 78, in 18 families.
