= Pataveh-ye Kari =

Pataveh-ye Kari پاتاوه كري
- Village
- Location within Iran
- Coordinates: 30°55′12″N 50°46′52″E
- Country: Iran
- Province: Kohgiluyeh and Boyer-Ahmad
- County: Charam
- Bakhsh: Sarfaryab
- Rural District: Poshteh-ye Zilayi

Population (2006)
  - Total: 103
- Time zone: UTC+3:30 (IRST)
  - Summer (DST): UTC+4:30 (IRDT)

Pataveh-ye Kari (Persian: پاتاوه كري, also Romanized as Pātāveh-ye Karī; also known as Pātāveh) is a village in Poshteh-ye Zilayi Rural District, Sarfaryab District, Charam County, Kohgiluyeh and Boyer-Ahmad Province, Iran. At the 2006 census, its population was 103, in 17 families.
