= Darreh Gerow Chong =

Darreh Gerow Chong دره گروچنگ
- Village
- Location within Iran
- Coordinates: 31°03′18″N 50°43′29″E
- Country: Iran
- Province: Kohgiluyeh and Boyer-Ahmad
- County: Boyer-Ahmad
- Bakhsh: Ludab
- Rural District: Ludab

Population (2006)
  - Total: 39
- Time zone: UTC+3:30 (IRST)
  - Summer (DST): UTC+4:30 (IRDT)

Darreh Gerow Chong (Persian: دره گروچنگ; also known as 'Darreh Gerow) is a village in Ludab Rural District, Ludab District, Boyer-Ahmad County, Kohgiluyeh and Boyer-Ahmad Province, Iran. At the 2006 census, its population was 39, in 10 families.
