= Pataveh, Dehdez =

Pataveh پاتاوه
- Village
- Location within Iran
- Coordinates: 31°45′02″N 50°10′07″E
- Country: Iran
- Province: Khuzestan
- County: Izeh
- Bakhsh: Dehdez
- Rural District: Donbaleh Rud-e Shomali

Population (2006)
  - Total: 98
- Time zone: UTC+3:30 (IRST)
  - Summer (DST): UTC+4:30 (IRDT)

Pataveh (Persian: پاتاوه, also Romanized as Pātāveh) is a village in Donbaleh Rud-e Shomali Rural District, Dehdez District, Izeh County, Khuzestan Province, Iran. At the 2006 census, its population was 98, in 20 families.
