= Sar Bisheh, Kohgiluyeh and Boyer-Ahmad =

Sar Bisheh سربيشه
- Village
- Location within Iran
- Coordinates: 30°16′57″N 50°59′39″E
- Country: Iran
- Province: Kohgiluyeh and Boyer-Ahmad
- County: Gachsaran
- Bakhsh: Central
- Rural District: Emamzadeh Jafar

Population (2006)
  - Total: 1,184
- Time zone: UTC+3:30 (IRST)
  - Summer (DST): UTC+4:30 (IRDT)

Sarbisheh (Persian: سربيشه, also Romanized as Sar Bīsheh) is a village in Emamzadeh Jafar Rural District, in the Central District of Gachsaran County, Kohgiluyeh and Boyer-Ahmad Province, Iran. At the 2006 census, its population was 1,184, in 253 families.
