= Lir Abi, Lordegan =

Lir Abi ليرابي
- Village
- Location within Iran
- Coordinates: 31°29′42″N 50°41′43″E
- Country: Iran
- Province: Chaharmahal and Bakhtiari
- County: Lordegan
- Bakhsh: Central
- Rural District: Milas

Population (2006)
  - Total: 304
- Time zone: UTC+3:30 (IRST)
  - Summer (DST): UTC+4:30 (IRDT)

Lir Abi (Persian: ليرابي, also Romanized as Līr Ābī; also known as Līr) is a village in Milas Rural District, in the Central District of Lordegan County, Chaharmahal and Bakhtiari Province, Iran. At the 2006 census, its population was 304, in 55 families.
