= Suq, Iran =

City in Kohgiluyeh and Boyer-Ahmad province, Iran

Suq Persian: سوق
- City
- Location within Iran
- Coordinates: 30°51′34″N 50°27′26″E
- Country: Iran
- Province: Kohgiluyeh and Boyer-Ahmad
- County: Kohgiluyeh
- District: Suq

Population (2016)
  - Total: 6,438
- Time zone: UTC+3:30 (IRST)

Suq (Persian: سوق) (Note: Also romanized as Sūq) is a city in, and the capital of, Suq District of Kohgiluyeh County, Kohgiluyeh and Boyer-Ahmad province, Iran. It also serves as the administrative center for Tayebi-ye Garmsiri-ye Jonubi Rural District.

== Demographics ==
=== Population ===
At the time of the 2006 National Census, the city's population was 5,890 in 1,190 households, when it was in the Central District. The following census in 2011 counted 5,993 people in 1,390 households. The 2016 census measured the population of the city as 6,438 people in 1,695 households, by which time the rural district and the city had been separated from the district in the formation of Suq District.
