= Sar Bisheh, Lorestan =

Sar Bisheh سربيشه
- Village
- Location within Iran
- Coordinates: 33°10′33″N 49°13′40″E
- Country: Iran
- Province: Lorestan
- County: Aligudarz
- Bakhsh: Zaz and Mahru
- Rural District: Zaz-e Sharqi

Population (2006)
  - Total: 99
- Time zone: UTC+3:30 (IRST)
  - Summer (DST): UTC+4:30 (IRDT)

Sar Bisheh (Persian: سربيشه, also Romanized as Sar Bīsheh and Sarbīsheh) is a village in Zaz-e Sharqi Rural District, Zaz and Mahru District, Aligudarz County, Lorestan Province, Iran. At the 2006 census, its population was 99, in 15 families.
