= Pataveh-ye Delita =

Village in Kohgiluyeh and Boyer-Ahmad, Iran

Pataveh-ye Delita پاتاوه دلي تا
- Village
- Location within Iran
- Coordinates: 30°49′53″N 50°48′40″E
- Country: Iran
- Province: Kohgiluyeh and Boyer-Ahmad
- County: Boyer-Ahmad
- Bakhsh: Ludab
- Rural District: Ludab

Population (2006)
  - Total: 14
- Time zone: UTC+3:30 (IRST)
  - Summer (DST): UTC+4:30 (IRDT)

Pataveh-ye Delita (Persian: پاتاوه دلي تا, also romanized as Paţāveh-ye Delītā; also known as Pā Ţāveh, Pātāveh, Paţāveh-ye Kameyān, and Peţāveh) is a village in Ludab Rural District, Ludab District, Boyer-Ahmad County, Kohgiluyeh and Boyer-Ahmad Province, Iran. At the 2006 census, its population was 14, in 4 families.
