= Ajam Rural District =

Rural district in Kohgiluyeh and Boyer-Ahmad province, Iran

Ajam Rural District Persian: دهستان آجم
- Rural District
- Location within Iran
- Coordinates: 31°14′36″N 50°39′54″E
- Country: Iran
- Province: Kohgiluyeh and Boyer-Ahmad
- County: Kohgiluyeh
- District: Dishmuk
- Capital: Pataveh-ye Ajam

Population (2016)
  - Total: 401
- Time zone: UTC+3:30 (IRST)

Ajam Rural District (Persian: دهستان آجم) is in Dishmuk District of Kohgiluyeh County, Kohgiluyeh and Boyer-Ahmad province, Iran. Its capital is the village of Pataveh-ye Ajam.

== Demographics ==
=== Population ===
At the time of the 2006 National Census, the rural district's population was 706 in 124 households. There were 84 inhabitants in 18 households at the following census of 2011. The 2016 census measured the population of the rural district as 401 in 89 households. The most populous of its 18 villages was Rud Rish, with 256 people.
