= Suq District =

District in Kohgiluyeh and Boyer-Ahmad province, Iran

Suq District Persian: بخش سوق
- District
- Location within Iran
- Coordinates: 30°51′32″N 50°27′02″E
- Country: Iran
- Province: Kohgiluyeh and Boyer-Ahmad
- County: Kohgiluyeh
- Capital: Suq

Population (2016)
  - Total: 11,655
- Time zone: UTC+3:30 (IRST)

Suq District (Persian: بخش سوق) is in Kohgiluyeh County, Kohgiluyeh and Boyer-Ahmad province, Iran. Its capital is the city of Suq.

== History ==
After the 2011 National Census, Rak and Tayebi-ye Garmsiri-ye Jonubi Rural Districts, and the city of Suq, were separated from the Central District in the formation of Suq District.

== Demographics ==
=== Population ===
At the time of the 2016 census, the district's population was 11,655 inhabitants in 3,077 households.

=== Administrative divisions ===
Suq District Population
Administrative Divisions	2016
Rak RD	4,366
Tayebi-ye Garmsiri-ye Jonubi RD	851
Suq (city)	6,438
Total	11,655
RD = Rural District
