= Dehdasht-e Gharbi Rural District =

Rural district in Kohgiluyeh and Boyer-Ahmad province, Iran

Dehdasht-e Gharbi Rural District Persian: دهستان دهدشت غربي
- Rural District
- Location within Iran
- Coordinates: 30°41′27″N 50°32′55″E
- Country: Iran
- Province: Kohgiluyeh and Boyer-Ahmad
- County: Kohgiluyeh
- District: Central
- Capital: Sar-e Mahur

Population (2016)
  - Total: 8,826
- Time zone: UTC+3:30 (IRST)

Dehdasht-e Gharbi Rural District (Persian: دهستان دهدشت غربي) is in the Central District of Kohgiluyeh County, Kohgiluyeh and Boyer-Ahmad province, Iran. Its capital is the village of Sar-e Mahur.

== Demographics ==
=== Population ===
At the time of the 2006 National Census, the rural district's population was 9,118 in 1,768 households. There were 9,129 inhabitants in 2,095 households at the following census of 2011. The 2016 census measured the population of the rural district as 8,826 in 2,348 households. The most populous of its 73 villages was Changalva, with 1,567 people.
