= Rak Rural District =

Rural district in Kohgiluyeh and Boyer-Ahmad province, Iran

Rak Rural District Persian: دهستان راك
- Rural District
- Location within Iran
- Coordinates: 30°52′44″N 50°31′15″E
- Country: Iran
- Province: Kohgiluyeh and Boyer-Ahmad
- County: Kohgiluyeh
- District: Suq
- Capital: Rak

Population (2016)
  - Total: 4,366
- Time zone: UTC+3:30 (IRST)

Rak Rural District (Persian: دهستان راك) is in Suq District of Kohgiluyeh County, Kohgiluyeh and Boyer-Ahmad province, Iran. Its capital is the village of Rak.

== Demographics ==
=== Population ===
At the time of the 2006 National Census, the rural district's population (as a part of the Central District) was 5,130 in 1,038 households. There were 5,132 inhabitants in 1,176 households at the following census of 2011. The 2016 census measured the population of the rural district as 4,366 in 1,139 households, by which time the rural district had been separated from the district in the formation of Suq District. The most populous of its 25 villages was Rak, with 417 people.
