= Tayebi-ye Garmsiri-ye Jonubi Rural District =

Rural district in Kohgiluyeh and Boyer-Ahmad province, Iran

Tayebi-ye Garmsiri-ye Jonubi Rural District Persian: دهستان طيبي گرمسيرئ جنوبي
- Rural District
- Location within Iran
- Coordinates: 30°51′05″N 50°24′24″E
- Country: Iran
- Province: Kohgiluyeh and Boyer-Ahmad
- County: Kohgiluyeh
- District: Suq
- Capital: Suq

Population (2016)
  - Total: 851
- Time zone: UTC+3:30 (IRST)

Tayebi-ye Garmsiri-ye Jonubi Rural District (Persian: دهستان طيبي گرمسيرئ جنوبي) is in Suq District of Kohgiluyeh County, Kohgiluyeh and Boyer-Ahmad province, Iran. It is administered from the city of Suq.

== Demographics ==
=== Population ===
At the time of the 2006 National Census, the rural district's population (as a part of the Central District) was 1,433 in 306 households. There were 1,110 inhabitants in 255 households at the following census of 2011. The 2016 census measured the population of the rural district as 851 in 243 households, by which time the rural district had been separated from the district in the formation of Suq District. The most populous of its 20 villages was Lir-e Bozorg, with 196 people.
