= Doshman Ziari Rural District (Kohgiluyeh County) =

Rural district in Kohgiluyeh and Boyer-Ahmad province, Iran

Doshman Ziari Rural District Persian: دهستان دشمن زيارئ
- Rural District
- Location within Iran
- Coordinates: 31°00′52″N 50°35′48″E
- Country: Iran
- Province: Kohgiluyeh and Boyer-Ahmad
- County: Kohgiluyeh
- District: Central
- Capital: Qaleh Dokhtar

Population (2016)
  - Total: 4,029
- Time zone: UTC+3:30 (IRST)

Doshman Ziari Rural District (Persian: دهستان دشمن زيارئ) is in the Central District of Kohgiluyeh County, Kohgiluyeh and Boyer-Ahmad province, Iran. Its capital is the village of Qaleh Dokhtar.

== Demographics ==
=== Population ===
At the time of the 2006 National Census, the rural district's population was 6,405 in 1,206 households. There were 5,037 inhabitants in 1,162 households at the following census of 2011. The 2016 census measured the population of the rural district as 4,029 in 1,070 households. The most populous of its 52 villages was Kalat, with 440 people.
