= Bahmayi-ye Sarhadi-ye Gharbi Rural District =

Rural district in Kohgiluyeh and Boyer-Ahmad province, Iran

Bahmayi-ye Sarhadi-ye Gharbi Rural District Persian: دهستان بهمئي سرحدئ غربي
- Rural District
- Location within Iran
- Coordinates: 31°16′43″N 50°15′25″E
- Country: Iran
- Province: Kohgiluyeh and Boyer-Ahmad
- County: Kohgiluyeh
- District: Dishmuk
- Capital: Esfandan

Population (2016)
  - Total: 6,650
- Time zone: UTC+3:30 (IRST)

Bahmayi-ye Sarhadi-ye Gharbi Rural District (Persian: دهستان بهمئي سرحدئ غربي) is in Dishmuk District of Kohgiluyeh County, Kohgiluyeh and Boyer-Ahmad province, Iran. Its capital is the village of Esfandan.

== Demographics ==
=== Population ===
At the time of the 2006 National Census, the rural district's population was 7,539 in 1,360 households. There were 6,553 inhabitants in 1,352 households at the following census of 2011. The 2016 census measured the population of the rural district as 6,650 in 1,533 households. The most populous of its 31 villages was Darghak, with 1,222 people.
