= Bahmayi-ye Sarhadi-ye Sharqi Rural District =

Rural district in Kohgiluyeh and Boyer-Ahmad province, Iran

Bahmayi-ye Sarhadi-ye Sharqi Rural District Persian: دهستان بهمئي سرحدئ شرقي
- Rural District
- Location within Iran
- Coordinates: 31°20′26″N 50°21′16″E
- Country: Iran
- Province: Kohgiluyeh and Boyer-Ahmad
- County: Kohgiluyeh
- District: Dishmuk
- Capital: Dishmuk

Population (2016)
  - Total: 7,904
- Time zone: UTC+3:30 (IRST)

Bahmayi-ye Sarhadi-ye Sharqi Rural District (Persian: دهستان بهمئي سرحدئ شرقي) is in Dishmuk District of Kohgiluyeh County, Kohgiluyeh and Boyer-Ahmad province, Iran. It is administered from the city of Dishmuk.

== Demographics ==
=== Population ===
At the time of the 2006 National Census, the rural district's population was 8,348 in 1,491 households. There were 7,232 inhabitants in 1,452 households at the following census of 2011. The 2016 census measured the population of the rural district as 7,904 in 1,795 households. The most populous of its 53 villages was Lirab, with 555 people.
