= Dehdasht-e Sharqi Rural District =

Rural district in Kohgiluyeh and Boyer-Ahmad province, Iran

Dehdasht-e Sharqi Rural District Persian: دهستان دهدشت شرقي
- Rural District
- Location within Iran
- Coordinates: 30°48′42″N 50°39′08″E
- Country: Iran
- Province: Kohgiluyeh and Boyer-Ahmad
- County: Kohgiluyeh
- District: Central
- Capital: Zarghamabad

Population (2016)
  - Total: 12,277
- Time zone: UTC+3:30 (IRST)

Dehdasht-e Sharqi Rural District (Persian: دهستان دهدشت شرقي) is in the Central District of Kohgiluyeh County, Kohgiluyeh and Boyer-Ahmad province, Iran. Its capital is the village of Zarghamabad.

== Demographics ==
=== Population ===
At the time of the 2006 National Census, the rural district's population was 12,273 in 2,211 households. There were 12,863 inhabitants in 2,785 households at the following census of 2011. The 2016 census measured the population of the rural district as 12,277 in 3,159 households. The most populous of its 56 villages was Kelayeh-ye Sofla, with 1,401 people.
