= Dishmuk District =

District in Kohgiluyeh and Boyer-Ahmad province, Iran

Dishmuk District Persian: بخش دیشموک
- District
- Location within Iran
- Coordinates: 31°17′37″N 50°28′04″E
- Country: Iran
- Province: Kohgiluyeh and Boyer-Ahmad
- County: Kohgiluyeh
- Capital: Dishmuk

Population (2016)
  - Total: 20,746
- Time zone: UTC+3:30 (IRST)

Dishmuk District (Persian: بخش دیشموک) is in Kohgiluyeh County, Kohgiluyeh and Boyer-Ahmad province, Iran. Its capital is the city of Dishmuk.

== Demographics ==
=== Population ===
At the time of the 2006 National Census, the district's population was 20,646 in 3,685 households. The following census in 2011 counted 18,744 people in 3,779 households. The 2016 census measured the population of the district as 20,746 inhabitants in 4,711 households.

=== Administrative divisions ===
Dishmuk District Population
Administrative Divisions	2006	2011	2016
Ajam RD	706	84	401
Bahmayi-ye Sarhadi-ye Gharbi RD	7,539	6,553	6,650
Bahmayi-ye Sarhadi-ye Sharqi RD	8,348	7,232	7,904
Dishmuk (city)	4,053	4,875	5,791
Total	20,646	18,744	20,746
RD = Rural District
