= Central District (Kohgiluyeh County) =

District in Kohgiluyeh and Boyer-Ahmad province, Iran

Central District (Kohgiluyeh County) Persian: بخش مرکزی شهرستان کهگیلویه
- District
- Location within Iran
- Coordinates: 30°50′00″N 50°34′29″E
- Country: Iran
- Province: Kohgiluyeh and Boyer-Ahmad
- County: Kohgiluyeh
- Capital: Dehdasht

Population (2016)
  - Total: 82,168
- Time zone: UTC+3:30 (IRST)

The Central District of Kohgiluyeh County (Persian: بخش مرکزی شهرستان کهگیلویه) is in Kohgiluyeh and Boyer-Ahmad province, Iran. Its capital is the city of Dehdasht.

== History ==
After the 2011 National Census, Rak and Tayebi-ye Garmsiri-ye Jonubi Rural Districts, and the city of Suq, were separated from the district in the formation of Suq District.

== Demographics ==
=== Population ===
At the time of the 2006 census, the district's population was 90,244 in 17,347 households. The following census in 2011 counted 95,543 people in 21,325 households. The 2016 census measured the population of the district as 82,168 inhabitants in 20,586 households.

=== Administrative divisions ===
Central District (Kohgiluyeh County) Population
Administrative Divisions	2006	2011	2016
Dehdasht-e Gharbi RD	9,118	9,129	8,826
Dehdasht-e Sharqi RD	12,273	12,863	12,277
Doshman Ziari RD	6,405	5,037	4,029
Rak RD (Note: Transferred to Suq District)	5,130	5,132	
Tayebi-ye Garmsiri-ye Jonubi RD	1,433	1,110	
Dehdasht (city)	49,995	56,279	57,036
Suq (city)	5,890	5,993	
Total	90,244	95,543	82,168
RD = Rural District
