= Kohgiluyeh County =

County in Kohgiluyeh and Boyer-Ahmad province, Iran

Kohgiluyeh County Persian: شهرستان کهگیلویه
- County
- Location of Kohgiluyeh County in Kohgiluyeh and Boyer-Ahmad province (top, green)

- Location of Kohgiluyeh and Boyer-Ahmad province in Iran
- Coordinates: 31°01′N 50°28′E
- Country: Iran
- Province: Kohgiluyeh and Boyer-Ahmad
- Capital: Dehdasht
- Districts: Central, Charusa, Dishmuk, Suq

Population (2016)
  - Total: 131,351
- Time zone: UTC+3:30 (IRST)

Kohgiluyeh County (Persian: شهرستان کهگیلویه) is in Kohgiluyeh and Boyer-Ahmad province, in southwestern Iran. Its capital is the city of Dehdasht.

== History ==
After the 2006 National Census, Charam (Note: Renamed the Central District of Charam County) and Sarfaryab Districts were separated from the county in the establishment of Charam County.

After the 2011 census, Landeh District was separated from the county in the establishment of Landeh County. Additionally, Rak and Tayebi-ye Garmsiri-ye Jonubi Rural Districts, and the city of Suq, were separated from the Central District in the formation of Suq District.

== Demographics ==
=== Population ===
At the time of the 2006 census, the county's population was 189,939 in 36,038 households. The following census in 2011 counted 153,695 people in 33,589 households. The 2016 census measured the population of the county as 131,351 in 32,457 households.

=== Administrative divisions ===
Kohgiluyeh County's population history and administrative structure over three consecutive censuses are shown in the following table.

Kohgiluyeh County Population
| Administrative Divisions | 2006 | 2011 | 2016 |
|---|---|---|---|
| Central District | 90,244 | 95,543 | 82,168 |
| Dehdasht-e Gharbi RD | 9,118 | 9,129 | 8,826 |
| Dehdasht-e Sharqi RD | 12,273 | 12,863 | 12,277 |
| Doshman Ziari RD | 6,405 | 5,037 | 4,029 |
| Rak RD | 5,130 | 5,132 | |
| Tayebi-ye Garmsiri-ye Jonubi RD | 1,433 | 1,110 | |
| Dehdasht (city) | 49,995 | 56,279 | 57,036 |
| Suq (city) | 5,890 | 5,993 | |
| Charam District (Note: Transferred to Charam County and renamed the Central District) | 24,989 | | |
| Alqchin RD | 5,775 | | |
| Charam RD | 7,234 | | |
| Charam (city) | 11,980 | | |
| Charusa District | 21,660 | 17,943 | 16,553 |
| Tayebi-ye Sarhadi-ye Gharbi RD | 9,993 | 8,115 | 7,449 |
| Tayebi-ye Sarhadi-ye Sharqi RD | 9,063 | 6,266 | 5,835 |
| Qaleh Raisi (city) | 2,604 | 3,562 | 3,269 |
| Dishmuk District | 20,646 | 18,744 | 20,746 |
| Ajam RD | 706 | 84 | 401 |
| Bahmayi-ye Sarhadi-ye Gharbi RD | 7,539 | 6,553 | 6,650 |
| Bahmayi-ye Sarhadi-ye Sharqi RD | 8,348 | 7,232 | 7,904 |
| Dishmuk (city) | 4,053 | 4,875 | 5,791 |
| Landeh District (Note: Transferred to Landeh County) | 21,151 | 21,367 | |
| Olya Tayeb RD | 3,253 | 2,144 | |
| Tayebi-ye Garmsiri-ye Shomali RD | 7,358 | 7,553 | |
| Landeh (city) | 10,540 | 11,670 | |
| Sarfaryab District (Note: Transferred to Charam County) | 11,249 | | |
| Poshteh-ye Zilayi RD | 4,217 | | |
| Sarfaryab RD | 7,032 | | |
| Suq District | | | 11,655 |
| Rak RD | | | 4,366 |
| Tayebi-ye Garmsiri-ye Jonubi RD | | | 851 |
| Suq (city) | | | 6,438 |
| Total | 189,939 | 153,695 | 131,351 |
RD = Rural District

== See also ==
Media related to Kohgiluyeh County at Wikimedia Commons
