= Bushkan (disambiguation) =

Bushkan is a village in Bushehr Province, Iran

Bushkan (Persian: بوشكان) may also refer to:

- Bushkan, Sepidan, Fars Province
- Bushkan-e Deylami, Fars Province
- Bushkan-e Mirzai, Fars Province
- Bushkan District, in Bushehr Province
- Bushkan Rural District, in Bushehr Province
