= Deh Now-e Razaviyeh =

Deh Now-e Razaviyeh دهنورضويه
- Village
- Location within Iran
- Coordinates: 31°32′24″N 56°06′00″E
- Country: Iran
- Province: Yazd
- County: Bafq
- Bakhsh: Central
- Rural District: Sabzdasht

Population (2006)
  - Total: 11
- Time zone: UTC+3:30 (IRST)
  - Summer (DST): UTC+4:30 (IRDT)

Deh Now-e Razaviyeh (Persian: دهنورضويه, also Romanized as Deh Now-e Raẕavīyeh; also known as Deh Now) is a village in Sabzdasht Rural District, in the Central District of Bafq County, Yazd Province, Iran. At the 2006 census, its population was 11, in 4 families.
