= Kermani, Yazd =

Kermani كرماني
- Village
- Location within Iran
- Coordinates: 31°28′38″N 55°59′06″E
- Country: Iran
- Province: Yazd
- County: Bafq
- Bakhsh: Central
- Rural District: Sabzdasht

Population (2006)
  - Total: 112
- Time zone: UTC+3:30 (IRST)
  - Summer (DST): UTC+4:30 (IRDT)

Kermani (Persian: كرماني, also Romanized as Kermānī; also known as Kermānīyeh) is a village in Sabzdasht Rural District, in the Central District of Bafq County, Yazd Province, Iran. At the 2006 census, its population was 112, in 38 families.
