= Darestan =

Darestan (Sorani Kurdish: دارستان), the Kurdish word for forest, may refer to the following places in Iran:

- Darestan, Gilan
- Darestan, Ravar, Kerman Province
- Darestan, Sirjan, Kerman Province
- Darestan-e Bala, Kerman Province
- Darestan, Markazi
- Darestan, Yazd
