= Hakimabad, Bafq =

Hakimabad حكيم اباد
- Village
- Location within Iran
- Coordinates: 31°30′43″N 55°56′09″E
- Country: Iran
- Province: Yazd
- County: Bafq
- Bakhsh: Central
- Rural District: Sabzdasht

Population (2006)
  - Total: 18
- Time zone: UTC+3:30 (IRST)
  - Summer (DST): UTC+4:30 (IRDT)

Hakimabad (Persian: حكيم اباد, also Romanized as Ḩakīmābād) is a village in Sabzdasht Rural District, in the Central District of Bafq County, Yazd Province, Iran. At the 2006 census, its population was 18, in 8 families.
