= Aliabad-e Gowd Ginestan =

Aliabad-e Gowd Ginestan علي ابادگودگينستان
- Village
- Country: Iran
- Province: Yazd
- County: Bafq
- Bakhsh: Central
- Rural District: Sabzdasht

Population (2006)
  - Total: 11
- Time zone: UTC+3:30 (IRST)
  - Summer (DST): UTC+4:30 (IRDT)

Aliabad-e Gowd Ginestan (Persian: علي ابادگودگينستان, also Romanized as ‘Alīābād-e Gowd Gīnestān) is a village in Sabzdasht Rural District, in the Central District of Bafq County, Yazd Province, Iran. At the 2006 census, its population was 11, in 6 families.
