= Bidan-e Panj =

Bidan-e Panj بيدان پنج
- Village
- Location within Iran
- Coordinates: 31°34′10″N 56°09′55″E
- Country: Iran
- Province: Yazd
- County: Bafq
- Bakhsh: Central
- Rural District: Sabzdasht

Population (2006)
  - Total: 56
- Time zone: UTC+3:30 (IRST)
  - Summer (DST): UTC+4:30 (IRDT)

Bidan-e Panj (Persian: بيدان پنج, also Romanized as Bīdān-e Panj) is a village in Sabzdasht Rural District, in the Central District of Bafq County, Yazd Province, Iran. At the 2006 census, its population was 56, belonging to 15 families.
