= Dowlatabad, Bafq =

Dowlatabad دولت اباد
- Village
- Location within Iran
- Coordinates: 31°32′24″N 55°54′26″E
- Country: Iran
- Province: Yazd
- County: Bafq
- Bakhsh: Central
- Rural District: Sabzdasht

Population (2006)
  - Total: 271
- Time zone: UTC+3:30 (IRST)
  - Summer (DST): UTC+4:30 (IRDT)

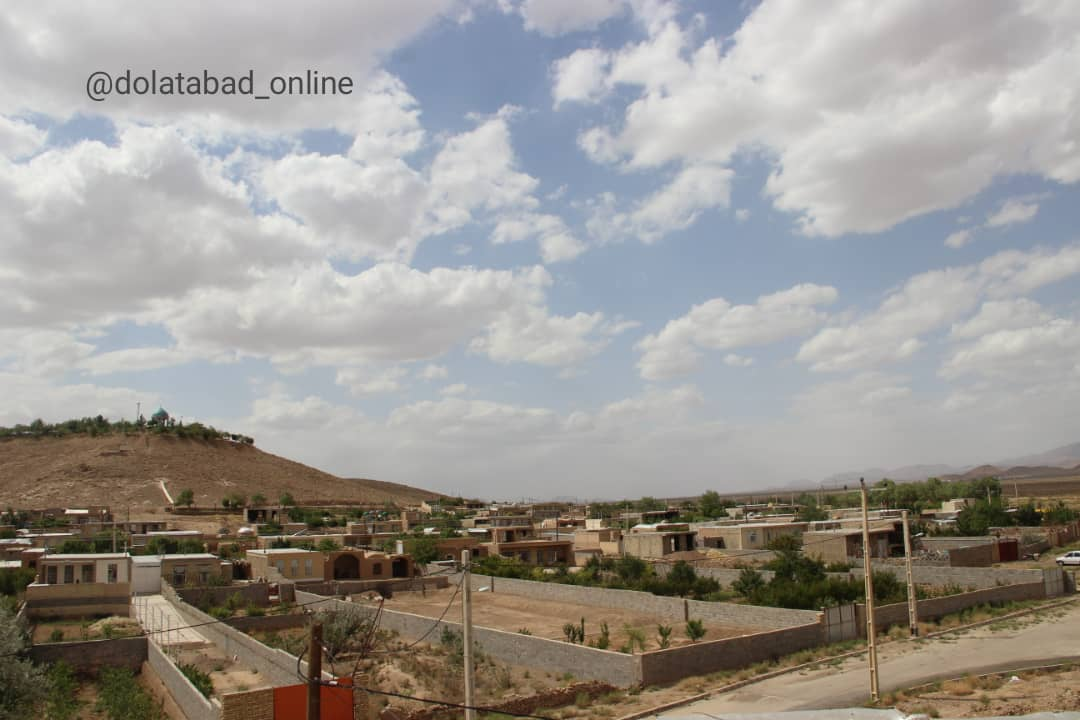

Dowlatabad (Persian: دولت اباد, also Romanized as Dowlatābād; also known as Daulatābād) is a village in Sabzdasht Rural District, in the Central District of Bafq County, Yazd Province, Iran. At the 2006 census, its population was 271, in 52 families.
