= Gazestan =

Gazestan (Persian: گزستان) may refer to:

- Gazestan, Chaharmahal and Bakhtiari
- Gazestan, Isfahan
- Gazestan, Kerman
- Gazestan, Kharanaq, Ardakan County, Yazd Province
- Gazestan, Bafq, Yazd Province
