= Tashkuiyeh, Yazd =

Tashkuiyeh تاشكوييه
- Village
- Location within Iran
- Coordinates: 31°26′50″N 55°57′21″E
- Country: Iran
- Province: Yazd
- County: Bafq
- Bakhsh: Central
- Rural District: Sabzdasht

Population (2006)
  - Total: 93
- Time zone: UTC+3:30 (IRST)
  - Summer (DST): UTC+4:30 (IRDT)

Tashkuiyeh (Persian: تاشكوييه, also Romanized as Tāshkūiyeh; also known as Tāj Kūh and Tāj Kū’īyeh) is a village in Sabzdasht Rural District, in the Central District of Bafq County, Yazd Province, Iran. At the 2006 census, its population was 93, in 23 families.
