= Bashgan =

Bashgan (Persian: بشگان) may refer to:

- Bashgan, Fars
- Bashgan, Kermanshah
- Bashgan, Yazd
