= Aliabad-e Basab =

Aliabad-e Basab علي ابادبساب
- Village
- Location within Iran
- Coordinates: 31°30′19″N 55°56′41″E
- Country: Iran
- Province: Yazd
- County: Bafq
- Bakhsh: Central
- Rural District: Sabzdasht

Population (2006)
  - Total: 44
- Time zone: UTC+3:30 (IRST)
  - Summer (DST): UTC+4:30 (IRDT)

Aliabad-e Basab (Persian: علي ابادبساب, also Romanized as ‘Alīābād-e Basāb; also known as ‘Alīābād) is a village in Sabzdasht Rural District, in the Central District of Bafq County, Yazd Province, Iran. At the 2006 census, its population was 44, in 21 families.
