= Rasulabad, Yazd =

Rasulabad رسول اباد
- Village
- Country: Iran
- Province: Yazd
- County: Bafq
- Bakhsh: Central
- Rural District: Sabzdasht

Population (2006)
  - Total: 19
- Time zone: UTC+3:30 (IRST)
  - Summer (DST): UTC+4:30 (IRDT)

Rasulabad (Persian: رسول اباد, also Romanized as Rasūlābād) is a village in Sabzdasht Rural District, in the Central District of Bafq County, Yazd Province, Iran. At the 2006 census, its population was 19, in 5 families.
