= Bajgan, Yazd =

Bajgan باجگان
- village
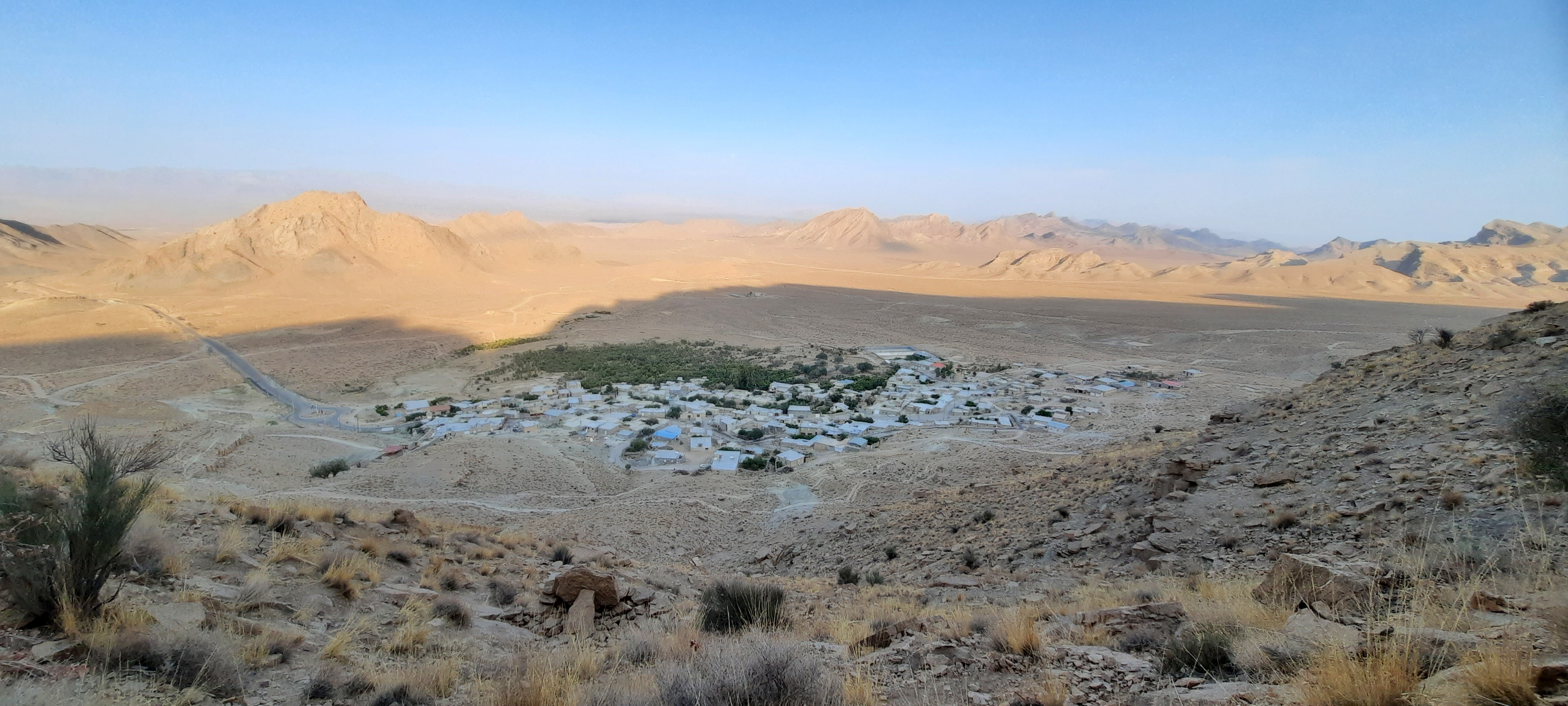

- Location within Iran
- Coordinates: 31°27′27″N 55°52′54″E
- Country: Iran
- Province: Yazd
- County: Bafq
- Bakhsh: Central
- Rural District: Sabzdasht

Population (2006)
  - Total: 161
- Time zone: UTC+3:30 (IRST)
  - Summer (DST): UTC+4:30 (IRDT)

Bajgan (Persian: باجگان, also Romanized as Bājgān; also known as Bājgūn, Bājīgān, and Būjīgān) is a village in Sabzdasht Rural District, in the Central District of Bafq County, Yazd Province, Iran. At the 2006 census, its population was 161, in 63 families.
