= Mohammadabad-e Gowd Ginestan =

Mohammadabad-e Gowd Ginestan محمدابادگودگينستان
- Village
- Country: Iran
- Province: Yazd
- County: Bafq
- Bakhsh: Central
- Rural District: Sabzdasht

Population (2006)
  - Total: 7
- Time zone: UTC+3:30 (IRST)
  - Summer (DST): UTC+4:30 (IRDT)

Mohammadabad-e Gowd Ginestan (Persian: محمدابادگودگينستان, also Romanized as Moḩammadābād-e Gowd Gīnestān) is a village in Sabzdasht Rural District, in the Central District of Bafq County, Yazd Province, Iran. As of the 2006 census, its population was 7, with there being 4 families.
