= Darestan, Yazd =

Darestan دارستان
- Village
- Location within Iran
- Coordinates: 31°45′11″N 55°51′56″E
- Country: Iran
- Province: Yazd
- County: Bafq
- Bakhsh: Central
- Rural District: Kushk

Population (2006)
  - Total: 13
- Time zone: UTC+3:30 (IRST)
  - Summer (DST): UTC+4:30 (IRDT)

Darestan (Persian: دارستان, also Romanized as Dārestān) is a village in Kushk Rural District, in the Central District of Bafq County, Yazd Province, Iran. At the 2006 census, its population was 13, in 7 families.
