= Deh Nowiyeh, Yazd =

Deh Nowiyeh دهنوييه
- Village
- Location within Iran
- Coordinates: 31°29′24″N 55°57′00″E
- Country: Iran
- Province: Yazd
- County: Bafq
- Bakhsh: Central
- Rural District: Sabzdasht

Population (2006)
  - Total: 15
- Time zone: UTC+3:30 (IRST)
  - Summer (DST): UTC+4:30 (IRDT)

Deh Nowiyeh (Persian: دهنوييه, also Romanized as Deh Nowīyeh) is a village in Sabzdasht Rural District, in the Central District of Bafq County, Yazd Province, Iran. At the 2006 census, its population was 15, in 7 families.
