= Deh Nowiyeh =

Deh Nowiyeh or Deh Nevoiyeh (Persian: ده نوييه) may refer to:

- Deh Nevoiyeh, Kerman
- Deh Nowiyeh, Kuhbanan, Kerman Province
- Deh Nowiyeh, Yazd
