= Jazestan =

Jazestan (Persian: جازستان) may refer to:

- Jazestan, Khuzestan
- Jazestan, Yazd

== See also ==
- Jazestan Pareh
