= Basab =

Village in Yazd province, Iran

Basab Persian: بساب
- Village
- Location within Iran
- Coordinates: 31°28′58″N 55°58′17″E
- Country: Iran
- Province: Yazd
- County: Bafq
- District: Central
- Rural District: Sabzdasht

Population (2016)
  - Total: 234
- Time zone: UTC+3:30 (IRST)

Basab (Persian: بساب) (Note: Also romanized as Basāb; also known as Besāb Maḩmūdābād and Maḩmūdābād) is a village in, and the capital of, Sabzdasht Rural District of the Central District of Bafq County, Yazd province, Iran.

== Demographics ==
=== Population ===
At the time of the 2006 National Census, the village's population was 171 in 51 households. The following census in 2011 counted 310 people in 103 households. The 2016 census measured the population of the village as 234 people in 87 households.
