= Ali Hoseyna =

Ali Hoseyna (Persian: علي حسينا) may refer to:

- Ali Hoseyna, Sistan and Baluchestan
- Ali Hoseyna, Yazd
