= Sheytur =

Village in Yazd province, Iran

Sheytur Persian: شيطور
- Village
- Location within Iran
- Coordinates: 31°32′30″N 55°55′01″E
- Country: Iran
- Province: Yazd
- County: Bafq
- District: Central
- Rural District: Sabzdasht

Population (2016)
  - Total: 258
- Time zone: UTC+3:30 (IRST)

Sheytur (Persian: شيطور) (Note: Also romanized as Shaitūr and Sheyţūr) is a village in Sabzdasht Rural District of the Central District of Bafq County, Yazd province, Iran.

== Demographics ==
=== Population ===
At the time of the 2006 National Census, the village's population was 266 in 76 households. The following census in 2011 counted 534 people in 175 households. The 2016 census measured the population of the village as 258 people in 92 households. It was the most populous village in its rural district.
