= Kushk, Bafq =

Village in Yazd province, Iran

Kushk Persian: كوشك
- Village
- Location within Iran
- Coordinates: 31°44′23″N 55°47′16″E
- Country: Iran
- Province: Yazd
- County: Bafq
- District: Central
- Rural District: Kushk

Population (2016)
  - Total: 139
- Time zone: UTC+3:30 (IRST)

Kushk (Persian: كوشك) (Note: Also romanized as Kūshk; also known as Kooshk va Ma’dan Kooshk, and Kūseh) is a village in, and the capital of, Kushk Rural District of the Central District of Bafq County, Yazd province, Iran.

== Demographics ==
=== Population ===
At the time of the 2006 National Census, the village's population was 167 in 62 households. The following census in 2011 counted 343 people in 107 households. The 2016 census measured the population of the village as 139 people in 49 households. It was the most populous village in its rural district.
