= Bashgan, Yazd =

Bashgan بشگان
- Village
- Location within Iran
- Coordinates: 31°37′07″N 56°04′30″E
- Country: Iran
- Province: Yazd
- County: Bafq
- Bakhsh: Central
- Rural District: Sabzdasht

Population (2006)
  - Total: 86
- Time zone: UTC+3:30 (IRST)
  - Summer (DST): UTC+4:30 (IRDT)

Bashgan (Persian: بشگان, also Romanized as Bashgān; also known as Bashkān) is a village in Sabzdasht Rural District, in the Central District of Bafq County, Yazd Province, Iran. At the 2006 census, its population was 86, in 37 families.
