= Gazestan, Bafq =

Gazestan گزستان
- Village
- Location within Iran
- Coordinates: 31°42′33″N 55°54′09″E
- Country: Iran
- Province: Yazd
- County: Bafq
- Bakhsh: Central
- Rural District: Kushk

Population (2006)
  - Total: 69
- Time zone: UTC+3:30 (IRST)
  - Summer (DST): UTC+4:30 (IRDT)

Gazestan (Persian: گزستان, also Romanized as Gazestān; also known as Gāzīstān, Ghāzistān, Jarestān, and Jazestān) is a village in Kushk Rural District, in the Central District of Bafq County, Yazd Province, Iran. At the 2006 census, its population was 69, in 26 families.
