= Sar Maleh =

Village in Bushehr province, Iran

Sar Maleh Persian: سرمله
- Village
- Location within Iran
- Coordinates: 29°03′31″N 51°27′30″E
- Country: Iran
- Province: Bushehr
- County: Dashtestan
- District: Bushkan
- Rural District: Poshtkuh

Population (2016)
  - Total: 21
- Time zone: UTC+3:30 (IRST)

Sar Maleh (Persian: سرمله) (Note: Also known as Zīr Maleh and Zīrmoleh) is a village in Poshtkuh Rural District of Bushkan District in Dashtestan County, Bushehr province, Iran.

== Demographics ==
=== Population ===
At the time of the 2006 National Census, the village's population was 84 in 19 households. The following census in 2011 counted 60 people in 14 households. The 2016 census measured the population of the village as 21 people in five households.
