= Shahijani =

Village in Bushehr province, Iran

Shahijani Persian: شاهي جاني
- Village
- Location within Iran
- Coordinates: 28°52′11″N 51°29′38″E
- Country: Iran
- Province: Bushehr
- County: Dashtestan
- District: Bushkan
- Rural District: Poshtkuh

Population (2016)
  - Total: 209
- Time zone: UTC+3:30 (IRST)

Shahijani (Persian: شاهي جاني) (Note: Also romanized as Shāhī Jānī and Shāhījānī; also known as Shāhījān and Shāyejānī) is a village in Poshtkuh Rural District of Bushkan District in Dashtestan County, Bushehr province, Iran.

== Demographics ==
=== Population ===
At the time of the 2006 National Census, the village's population was 151 in 37 households. The following census in 2011 counted 138 people in 39 households. The 2016 census measured the population of the village as 209 people in 59 households.
