= Derang =

Village in Bushehr province, Iran

Derang Persian: درنگ
- Village
- Location within Iran
- Coordinates: 28°45′03″N 51°36′46″E
- Country: Iran
- Province: Bushehr
- County: Dashtestan
- District: Bushkan
- Rural District: Poshtkuh

Population (2016)
  - Total: 357
- Time zone: UTC+3:30 (IRST)

Derang (Persian: درنگ) is a village in Poshtkuh Rural District of Bushkan District in Dashtestan County, Bushehr province, Iran.

== Demographics ==
=== Population ===
At the time of the 2006 National Census, the village's population was 334 in 69 households. The following census in 2011 counted 326 people in 75 households. The 2016 census measured the population of the village as 357 people in 108 households.
