= Hajjiabad, Dashtestan =

Village in Bushehr province, Iran

Hajjiabad Persian: حاجي اباد
- Village
- Location within Iran
- Country: Iran
- Province: Bushehr
- County: Dashtestan
- District: Bushkan
- Rural District: Bushkan

Population (2016)
  - Total: 156
- Time zone: UTC+3:30 (IRST)

Hajjiabad (Persian: حاجي اباد) (Note: Also romanized as Ḩājjīābād) is a village in Bushkan Rural District of Bushkan District in Dashtestan County, Bushehr province, Iran.

== Demographics ==
=== Population ===
At the time of the 2006 National Census, the village's population was 135 in 28 households. The following census in 2011 counted 99 people in 27 households. The 2016 census measured the population of the village as 156 people in 47 households.
