= Kushk Rural District =

Kushk Rural District (Persian: دهستان کوشک) may refer to:

- Kushk Rural District (Khuzestan Province)
- Kushk Rural District (Bafq County), Yazd province
