= Tang-e Zard, Bushehr =

Village in Bushehr province, Iran

Tang-e Zard Persian: تنگ زرد
- Village
- Location within Iran
- Coordinates: 28°54′31″N 51°29′18″E
- Country: Iran
- Province: Bushehr
- County: Dashtestan
- District: Bushkan
- Rural District: Poshtkuh

Population (2016)
  - Total: 468
- Time zone: UTC+3:30 (IRST)

Tang-e Zard (Persian: تنگ زرد) is a village in Poshtkuh Rural District of Bushkan District in Dashtestan County, Bushehr province, Iran.

== Demographics ==
=== Population ===
At the time of the 2006 National Census, the village's population was 373 in 116 households. The following census in 2011 counted 517 people in 132 households. The 2016 census measured the population of the village as 468 people in 138 households.
