= Tarian =

Tarian may refer to:

- Tărian, a village in Girișu de Criș Commune, Bihor County, Romania
- Faryab, Dashtestan, Iran
- Indonesian and Malay word for dancing.
