= Sholdan, Bushehr =

Village in Bushehr province, Iran

Sholdan Persian: شلدان
- Village
- Location within Iran
- Coordinates: 28°46′53″N 51°43′24″E
- Country: Iran
- Province: Bushehr
- County: Dashtestan
- District: Bushkan
- Rural District: Bushkan

Population (2016)
  - Total: 368
- Time zone: UTC+3:30 (IRST)

Sholdan (Persian: شلدان) (Note: Also romanized as Shaldān and Sholdān) is a village in Bushkan Rural District of Bushkan District in Dashtestan County, Bushehr province, Iran.

== Demographics ==
=== Population ===
At the time of the 2006 National Census, the village's population was 397 in 75 households. The following census in 2011 counted 345 people in 81 households. The 2016 census measured the population of the village as 368 people in 100 households.
