= Talheh =

Village in Bushehr province, Iran

Talheh Persian: طلحه
- Village
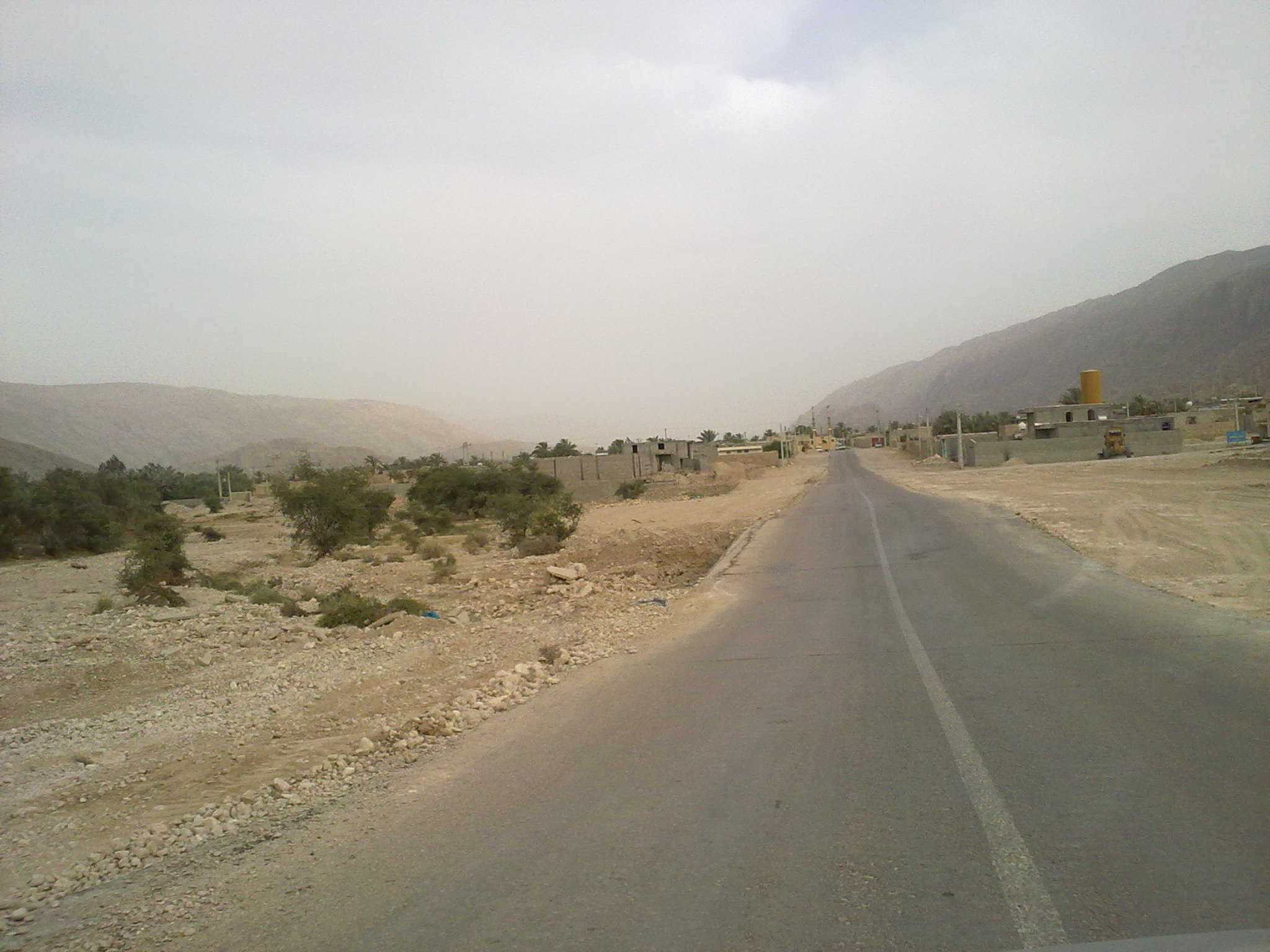
- The village of Talheh from the road

- Location within Iran
- Coordinates: 28°48′42″N 51°31′22″E
- Country: Iran
- Province: Bushehr
- County: Dashtestan
- District: Bushkan
- Rural District: Poshtkuh

Population (2016)
  - Total: 2,433
- Time zone: UTC+3:30 (IRST)

Talheh (Persian: طلحه) (Note: Also romanized as Ţalḩeh) is a village in Poshtkuh Rural District of Bushkan District in Dashtestan County, Bushehr province, Iran.

== Demographics ==
=== Population ===
At the time of the 2006 National Census, the village's population was 2,387 in 532 households. The following census in 2011 counted 2,218 people in 572 households. The 2016 census measured the population of the village as 2,433 people in 696 households. It was the most populous village in its rural district.
