= Nurabad, Bushehr =

Village in Bushehr province, Iran

Nurabad Persian: نورآباد
- Village
- Location within Iran
- Coordinates: 28°54′11″N 51°31′45″E
- Country: Iran
- Province: Bushehr
- County: Dashtestan
- District: Bushkan
- Rural District: Bushkan

Population (2016)
  - Total: 689
- Time zone: UTC+3:30 (IRST)

Nurabad (Persian: نورآباد) (Note: Also romanized as Nūrābād; also known as Khūn (خون)) is a village in Bushkan Rural District of Bushkan District in Dashtestan County, Bushehr province, Iran.

== Demographics ==
=== Population ===
At the time of the 2006 National Census, the village's population was 660 in 154 households. The following census in 2011 counted 663 people in 188 households. The 2016 census measured the population of the village as 689 people in 209 households. It was the most populous village in its rural district.
