= Mansurabad, Bushehr =

Village in Bushehr province, Iran

Mansurabad Persian: منصور اباد
- Village
- Country: Iran
- Province: Bushehr
- County: Dashtestan
- District: Bushkan
- Rural District: Bushkan

Population (2016)
  - Total: 79
- Time zone: UTC+3:30 (IRST)

Mansurabad (Persian: منصور اباد) (Note: Also romanized as Manṣūrābād) is a village in Bushkan Rural District of Bushkan District in Dashtestan County, Bushehr province, Iran.

== Demographics ==
=== Population ===
At the time of the 2006 National Census, the village's population was 82 in 17 households. The following census in 2011 counted 72 people in 18 households. The 2016 census measured the population of the village as 79 people in 19 households.
