= Shah Pesar Mard =

Village in Bushehr province, Iran

Shah Pesar Mard Persian: شاه پسرمرد
- Village
- Location within Iran
- Coordinates: 28°43′06″N 51°39′57″E
- Country: Iran
- Province: Bushehr
- County: Dashtestan
- District: Bushkan
- Rural District: Poshtkuh

Population (2016)
  - Total: 155
- Time zone: UTC+3:30 (IRST)

Shah Pesar Mard (Persian: شاه پسرمرد) (Note: Also romanized as Shāh Pesar Mard) is a village in Poshtkuh Rural District of Bushkan District in Dashtestan County, Bushehr province, Iran.

== Demographics ==
=== Population ===
At the time of the 2006 National Census, the village's population was 112 in 23 households. The following census in 2011 counted 128 people in 32 households. The 2016 census measured the population of the village as 155 people in 47 households.
