= Ilshahr =

Village in Bushehr province, Iran

Ilshahr Persian: ايلشهر
- Village
- Location within Iran
- Country: Iran
- Province: Bushehr
- County: Dashtestan
- District: Bushkan
- Rural District: Bushkan

Population (2016)
  - Total: 525
- Time zone: UTC+3:30 (IRST)

Ilshahr (Persian: ايلشهر) (Note: Also romanized as Īlshahr) is a village in Bushkan Rural District of Bushkan District in Dashtestan County, Bushehr province, Iran.

== Demographics ==
=== Population ===
At the time of the 2006 National Census, the village's population was 418 in 83 households. The following census in 2011 counted 422 people in 98 households. The 2016 census measured the population of the village as 525 people in 134 households.
