= Emamzadeh-ye Bedeh =

Village in Bushehr province, Iran

Emamzadeh-ye Bedeh Persian: امامزاده بده
- Village
- Location within Iran
- Coordinates: 28°47′37″N 51°45′04″E
- Country: Iran
- Province: Bushehr
- County: Dashtestan
- District: Bushkan
- Rural District: Bushkan

Population (2016)
  - Total: 252
- Time zone: UTC+3:30 (IRST)

Emamzadeh-ye Bedeh (Persian: امامزاده بده) (Note: Also romanized as Emāmzādeh-ye Bedeh; also known as Bedeh) is a village in Bushkan Rural District of Bushkan District in Dashtestan County, Bushehr province, Iran.

== Demographics ==
=== Population ===
At the time of the 2006 National Census, the village's population was 308 in 75 households. The following census in 2011 counted 275 people in 74 households. The 2016 census measured the population of the village as 252 people in 75 households.
