= Fahraj, Yazd =

Village in Yazd province, Iran

Fahraj Persian: فهرج
- Village
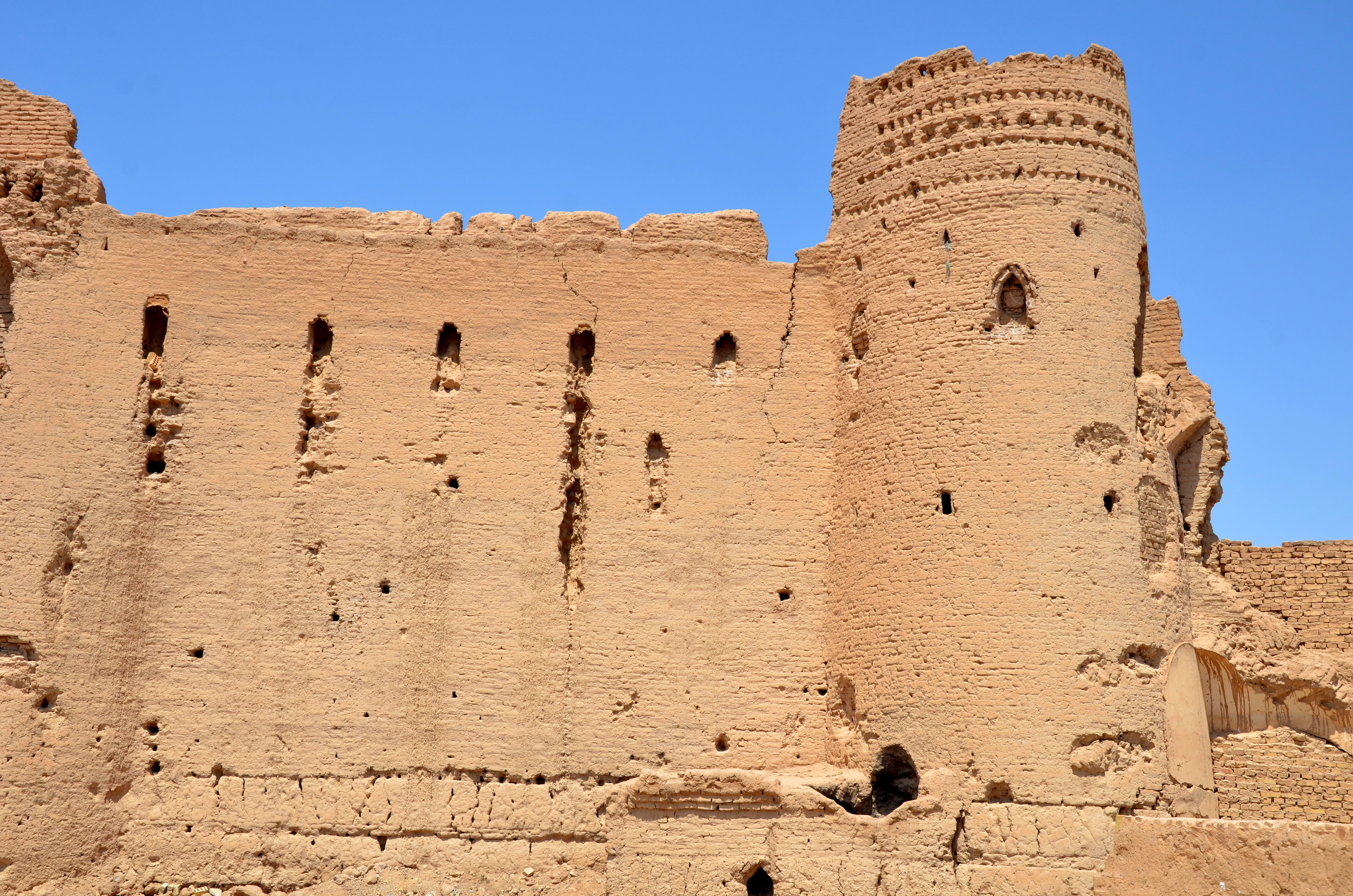
- Historical castle in Fahraj, Yazd

- Location within Iran
- Coordinates: 31°45′47″N 54°34′43″E
- Country: Iran
- Province: Yazd
- County: Yazd
- District: Central
- Rural District: Fahraj

Population (2016)
  - Total: 2,963
- Time zone: UTC+3:30 (IRST)

Fahraj (Persian: فهرج) (Note: Also romanized as Fahrej; also known as Fahruj and Faraj) is a village in Fahraj Rural District of the Central District of Yazd County, Yazd province, Iran.

Located 30 km southeast of Yazd on the road to Bafq, at the foothill of Chalta mountain, Fahraj lies in an arid region on the edge of the desert and relies on qanats and deep wells for its water supply. Its population consists mainly of Persian-speaking Shi'ites.

== History ==
In the Tarikh-e Yazd, Ja'far ibn Mohammad Ja'fari attributed Fahraj's founding to the Sasanian king Kavad I. As Bahra, the 10th-century geographers Estakhri and al-Moqaddasi listed Fahraj as one of the main towns in the province of Yazd, along with Meybod and Na'in. Like the other two, Fahraj was described as possessing a jameh mosque. Later, Abu'l-Fida gave the geographical coordinates of Fahraj, something he only did for places he considered important, indicating the continued significance of Fahraj at this time.

Fahraj was the scene of an episode during Muslim conquest of Persia. The army of the caliph Umar I, chasing the Sasanian emperor Yazdegerd III, came to Fahraj, where they called upon the town's Zorastrian inhabitants to convert to Islam. The people of Fahraj resisted, along with those of nearby Khovaydak and Faraftar, and they fought back against the Muslim army. A number of the companions of Muhammad, as well as members of the following generation, were killed. They came to be known as the šohadā-ye Fahraj, or "the martyrs of Fahraj", and mausoleums said to belong to them still exist at Abadi-ye Shohada, 2 km outside of Fahraj.

== Demographics ==
=== Population ===
At the time of the 2006 National Census, the village's population was 2,694 in 697 households. The following census in 2011 counted 2,690 people in 767 households. The 2016 census measured the population of the village as 2,963 people in 861 households.

== Mosque ==
The jameh mosque of Fahraj, located in the center of town, is one of the oldest extant mosques in Iran. It is made of sun-dried bricks, with the façade coated in sim-gel (a mixture of sand, clay, and chopped straw, gel-rig, and plaster bracing. The minaret, built in the 10th or 11th century, is made of smaller bricks. The eastern wall has stucco reliefs that, along with other decorative elements, resemble Sasanian art. In times of upheaval, people would store their valuables in hiding places in the mosque to protect them from thieves or raiders.
