= Zirmalleh =

Village in Bushehr province, Iran

Zirmalleh Persian: زيرمله
- Village
- Location within Iran
- Coordinates: 28°59′49″N 51°27′58″E
- Country: Iran
- Province: Bushehr
- County: Dashtestan
- District: Bushkan
- Rural District: Poshtkuh

Population (2016)
  - Total: 23
- Time zone: UTC+3:30 (IRST)

Zirmalleh (Persian: زيرمله) (Note: Also romanized as Zīrmalleh) is a village in Poshtkuh Rural District of Bushkan District in Dashtestan County, Bushehr province, Iran.

== Demographics ==
=== Population ===
At the time of the 2006 National Census, the village's population was 99 in 18 households. The following census in 2011 counted 45 people in 10 households. The 2016 census measured the population of the village as 23 people in six households.
