= Hoseynabad, Dashtestan =

Village in Bushehr province, Iran

Hoseynabad Persian: حسين اباد
- Village
- Location within Iran
- Country: Iran
- Province: Bushehr
- County: Dashtestan
- District: Bushkan
- Rural District: Bushkan

Population (2016)
  - Total: 178
- Time zone: UTC+3:30 (IRST)

Hoseynabad (Persian: حسين اباد) (Note: Also romanized as Ḩoseynābād) is a village in Bushkan Rural District of Bushkan District in Dashtestan County, Bushehr province, Iran.

== Demographics ==
=== Population ===
At the time of the 2006 National Census, the village's population was 68 in 14 households. The following census in 2011 counted 19 people in six households. The 2016 census measured the population of the village as 178 people in 47 households.
