= Ab Pay-ye Arghavan =

Village in Bushehr province, Iran

Ab Pay-ye Arghavan Persian: ابپاي ارغوان
- Village
- Location within Iran
- Coordinates: 29°06′32″N 51°24′24″E
- Country: Iran
- Province: Bushehr
- County: Dashtestan
- District: Bushkan
- Rural District: Poshtkuh

Population (2016)
  - Total: 24
- Time zone: UTC+3:30 (IRST)

Ab Pay-ye Arghavan (Persian: ابپاي ارغوان) (Note: Also romanized as Ab Pay-ye Arghuan and Āb Pāy-ye Arghūān; also known as Āb Pā-ye Arghūn, Apqūn, Arghūn, and Owpā-ye Arghūn) is a village in Poshtkuh Rural District of Bushkan District in Dashtestan County, Bushehr province, Iran.

== Demographics ==
=== Population ===
At the time of the 2006 National Census, the village's population was 124 in 27 households. The following census in 2011 counted 69 people in 18 households. The 2016 census measured the population of the village as 24 people in six households.
