= Kalameh =

City in Bushehr province, Iran

Kalameh Persian: كلمه
- City
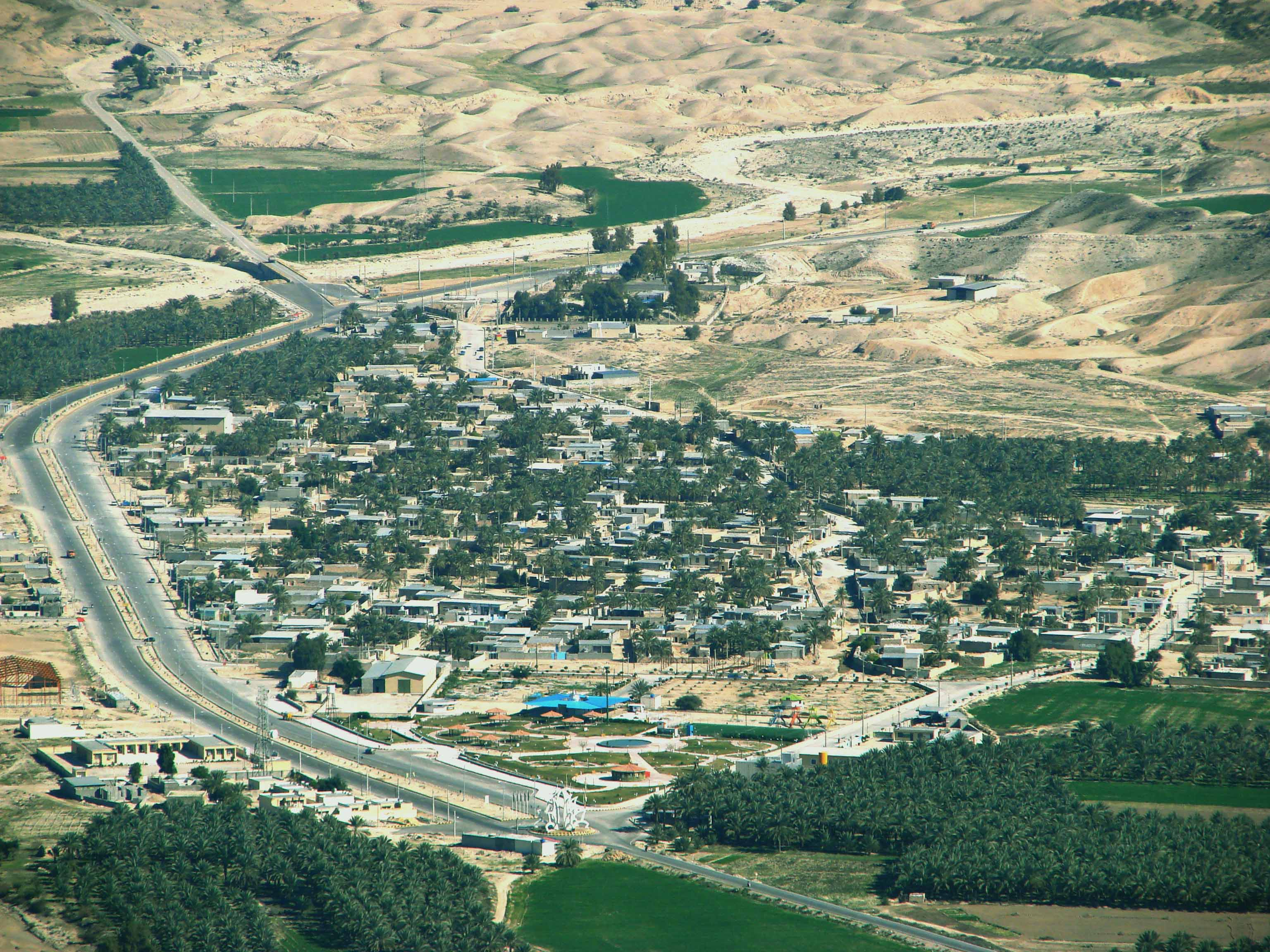
- The city of Kalameh

- Location within Iran
- Coordinates: 28°56′36″N 51°27′35″E
- Country: Iran
- Province: Bushehr
- County: Dashtestan
- District: Bushkan
- Established as a city: 2004

Population (2016)
  - Total: 2,463
- Time zone: UTC+3:30 (IRST)

Kalameh (Persian: كلمه) (Note: Also romanized as Kalmeh; also known as Kalimeh) is a city in, and the capital of, Bushkan District in Dashtestan County, Bushehr province, Iran. It also serves as the administrative center for Poshtkuh Rural District. The village of Kalameh was converted to a city in 2004.

== Demographics ==
=== Population ===
At the time of the 2006 National Census, the city's population was 1,937 in 436 households. The following census in 2011 counted 2,164 people in 569 households. The 2016 census measured the population of the city as 2,463 people in 736 households.

== See also ==
Media related to Kalameh at Wikimedia Commons
