= Sambice =

5th-century Iranian noblewoman

Sambice (Greek: Σαμβίκη) was a late 5th-century Iranian noblewoman from the Sasanian dynasty, who was the sister-wife of king (shah) Kavad I (r. 488–496, 498–531) and mother of his first son, Kawus. Perhaps she can be associated with the wife (or sister) of Kavad I who helped him escape from captivity in the Castle of Oblivion in 496.

== Sources ==
- Martindale, John R., ed. (1980). The Prosopography of the Later Roman Empire: Volume II, AD 395–527. Cambridge: Cambridge University Press. ISBN 0-521-20159-4.
