= Kawus =

Padishkhwargar Shah
- Reign: 520 – 532
- Predecessor: Unknown
- Successor: Unknown
- Born: 492
- Died: 533 (aged 40–41); Ctesiphon, Asoristan
- House: House of Sasan
- Father: Kavadh I
- Mother: Sambice
- Religion: Mazdakism

Kawus, recorded as Caoses by Procopius of Caesarea and Kayus (كيوس) by early Islamic sources, was the eldest son of Kavadh I, the Sasanian emperor of Iran. During the late reign of his father, Kawus was appointed as governor of Tabaristan, and was given the title of Padishkhwargar Shah (king of Padishkhwargar).

== Etymology ==
Kawus was probably named after the mythical/legendary king Kay Kawus (Avestan: Kauui Usan). The names of his father and his brothers also suggest a renewed late Sasanian interest in the Iranian legendary history and particularly the Kayanid Dynasty.

== Biography ==
Kawus might have initially been the heir presumptive to the Sasanian throne. However, following the outbreak of the Mazdakite revolt, Kawus was accused of supporting Mazdak and adhering to his heresy. His younger brother Khosrau, who was known for his support of orthodox Zoroastrianism, was favoured by the nobles and the Zoroastrian clerics. As a result, Kawus was passed over as the heir and the throne was offered to Khosrau.

During the late reign of his father, Kawus was appointed as governor of Tabaristan around 520 and was given the title of Padishkhwargar Shah (king of Padishkhwargar). In 532, Kawus aided Khosrau in defeating the Turks, and conquered Ghazni. However, when Kawus returned to Tabaristan after his victory, he rebelled and claimed the Sasanian throne from Khosrau. In order to limit his brother's base of power, Khosrau ordered the death of Mazdak and many of his prominent followers who supported Kawus. Kawus was defeated and brought to Ctesiphon, where he was given the option to confess his sins or die. He chose death.

== Sources ==
- Pourshariati, Parvaneh (2008). Decline and Fall of the Sasanian Empire: The Sasanian-Parthian Confederacy and the Arab Conquest of Iran. London and New York: I.B. Tauris. ISBN 978-1-84511-645-3.
