= Siege of Theodosiopolis =

502 siege

Coordinates: 39.9000°N 41.2667°E

- Part of the Anastasian War
Date	August 502
Location	Theodosiopolis (modern-day Erzurum, Turkey)
Result	Sasanian victory

Belligerents
Sasanian Empire	Byzantine Empire

Commanders and leaders
Kavadh I	Constantine (POW)

The siege of Theodosiopolis occurred in August 502, during the opening stages of the Anastasian War. The Sasanian ruler Kavadh I laid siege to the city of Theodosiopolis, a major Byzantine stronghold in western Armenia.

The chronicler Joshua the Stylite wrote in 507 that the general Constantine rebelled against emperor Anastasius I Dicorus, and then surrendered Theodosiopolis to the Sasanians. Joshua then writes that "Kawad (Kavadh I) consequently plundered the city, and destroyed and burned it; and he laid waste all the villages in the region of the north, and the fugitives that were left he carried off captive." Kavadh I then promoted Constantine general, before marching on.

After the successful siege, Kavadh I besieged other Byzantine cities, such as Amida.
