= Jamasp (son of Kavad I) =

Jamasp (also spelled Zamasp) was a 6th-century Sasanian prince, who was the second oldest son of the incumbent king (shah) Kavad I (r. 488–496, 498–531). Jamasp was greatly admired for his ability in war, but was disqualified from succession due to having lost an eye. The following year after the accession of his brother Khosrow I (r. 531–579), Bawi along with other members of the Iranian aristocracy, became involved in a conspiracy in which they tried to overthrow Khosrow and make Jamasp's son Kavad the new shah, so Jamasp could rule as regent. The conspiracy, however, was revealed and Jamasp was murdered.

== Sources ==
- Crone, Patricia (1991). "Kavād's Heresy and Mazdak's Revolt". Iran. 29: 21–42. doi:10.2307/4299846. JSTOR 4299846. (registration required)
- Greatrex, Geoffrey; Lieu, Samuel N. C. (2002). "Justinian's First Persian War and the Eternal Peace". The Roman Eastern Frontier and the Persian Wars (Part II, 363–630 AD). New York, New York and London, United Kingdom: Routledge. pp. 82–97. ISBN 0-415-14687-9.
- Pourshariati, Parvaneh (2008). Decline and Fall of the Sasanian Empire: The Sasanian-Parthian Confederacy and the Arab Conquest of Iran. London and New York: I.B. Tauris. ISBN 978-1-84511-645-3.
- Martindale, John R.; Morris, John (1980), The Prosopography of the Later Roman Empire: Volume II, AD 395–527, Cambridge University Press, ISBN 978-0521201599
