= Eran-asan-kerd-Kawad =

Eran-asan-kerd-Kawad or Iran asan kar(t) Kavad (Middle Persian: 𐭠𐭩𐭫𐭠𐭭𐭠𐭮𐭠𐭭𐭪𐭫𐭪𐭥𐭠𐭲 ʾylʾnʾsʾnklkwʾt, meaning "Kavad [has] made Ērān peaceful") was a Sasanian city founded by Kavad I (r. 488–496, 498–531) in the Hulwan region. It was the capital of a province possibly identical to the Hulwan region and bordering the provinces of Syarazur (Shahrizor) and Garamig. The geographer Josef Markwart placed the city between Adiabene and Garamig. It is mentioned in both Armenian sources and the Middle Persian Šahrestānīhā ī Ērānšahr ("Provincial Capitals of Ērān").

== Sources ==
- Daryaee, Touraj, ed. (2002). Šahrestānīhā Ī Ērānšahr: A Middle Persian Text on Late Antique Geography, Epic, and History. Mazda Publishers.
- Frye, R. N. (1983), "The political history of Iran under the Sasanians", in Yarshater, Ehsan (ed.), The Cambridge History of Iran: The Seleucid, Parthian and Sasanian periods, vol. 3, Cambridge University Press, p. 136, ISBN 978-0-521-20092-9
- Gyselen, Rika (1998). "ĒRĀN-ĀSĀN-KERD-KAWĀD". In Yarshater, Ehsan (ed.). Encyclopædia Iranica. Vol. VIII/5: English IV–Eršād al-zerāʿa. London and New York: Routledge & Kegan Paul. p. 536. ISBN 978-1-56859-054-7.
- Yarshater, Ehsan, ed. (1983), The Cambridge History of Iran: The Seleucid, Parthian and Sasanian periods, vol. 3, Cambridge University Press, pp. 1108, 1437, ISBN 978-0521246934
