= Poshtkuh Rural District (Dashtestan County) =

Rural district in Bushehr province, Iran

Poshtkuh Rural District Persian: دهستان پشتكوه
- Rural District
- Location within Iran
- Coordinates: 28°56′N 51°28′E
- Country: Iran
- Province: Bushehr
- County: Dashtestan
- District: Bushkan
- Established: 1987
- Capital: Kalameh

Population (2016)
  - Total: 5,911
- Time zone: UTC+3:30 (IRST)

Poshtkuh Rural District (Persian: دهستان پشتكوه) is in Bushkan District of Dashtestan County, Bushehr province, Iran. It is administered from the city of Kalameh.

== Demographics ==
=== Population ===
At the time of the 2006 National Census, the rural district's population was 5,896 in 1,325 households. There were 5,570 inhabitants in 1,465 households at the following census of 2011. The 2016 census measured the population of the rural district as 5,911 in 1,757 households. The most populous of its 15 villages was Talheh, with 2,433 people.

=== Other villages in the rural district ===
- Ab Pay-ye Arghavan
- Derang
- Faryab
- Sar Maleh
- Shah Pesar Mard
- Shahijani
- Tang-e Zard
- Zirmalleh
