= Faryab, Dashtestan =

Village in Bushehr province, Iran

Faryab Persian: فارياب
- Village
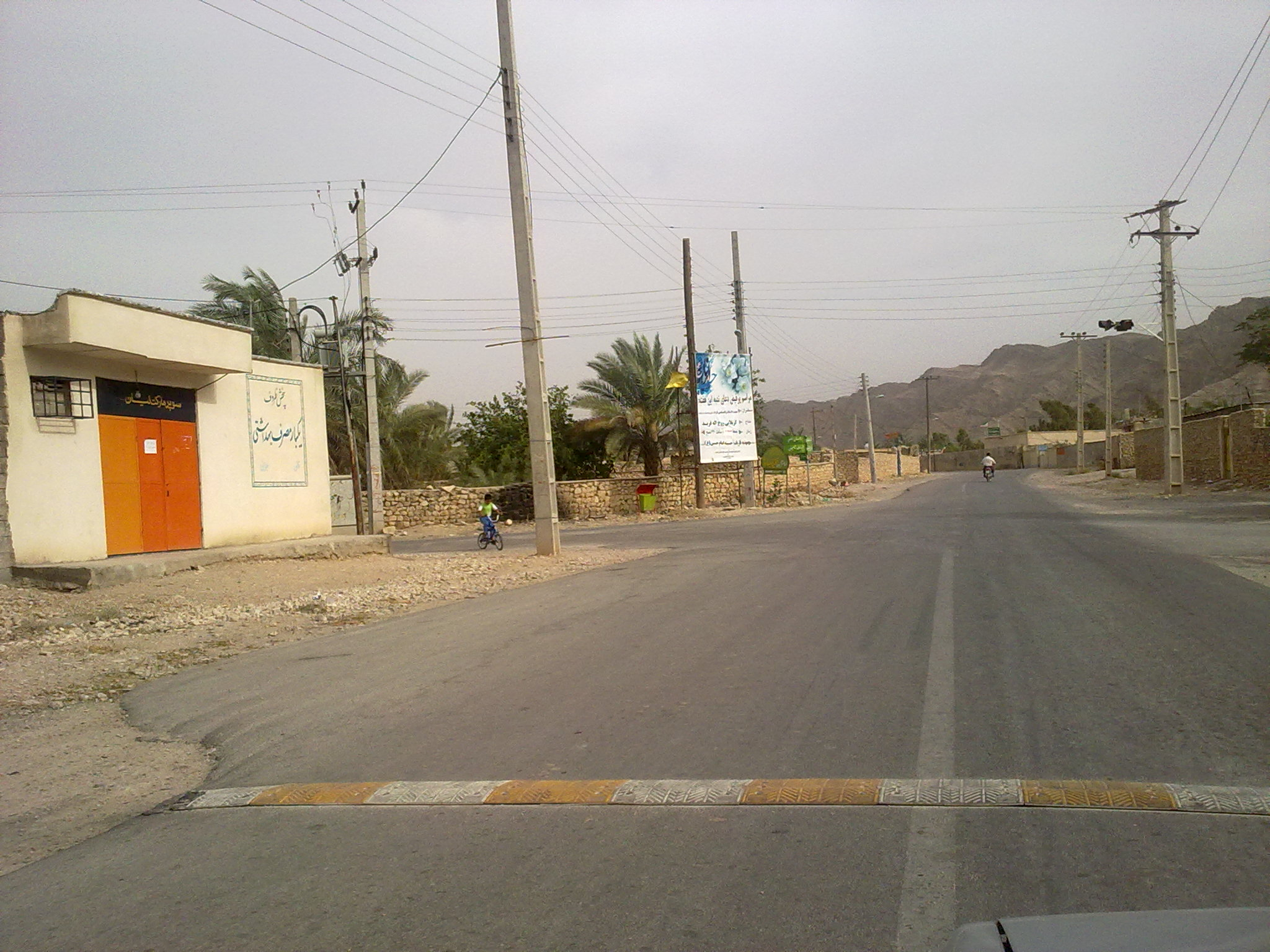
- Road in Faryab

- Location within Iran
- Coordinates: 28°54′08″N 51°27′55″E
- Country: Iran
- Province: Bushehr
- County: Dashtestan
- District: Bushkan
- Rural District: Poshtkuh

Population (2016)
  - Total: 2,221
- Time zone: UTC+3:30 (IRST)

Faryab (Persian: فارياب) (Note: Also romanized as Fāreyāb, Fāriyāb, and Fāryāb; also known as Pārīān and Tarian) is a village in Poshtkuh Rural District of Bushkan District in Dashtestan County, Bushehr province, Iran.

== Demographics ==
=== Population ===
At the time of the 2006 National Census, the village's population was 2,027 in 483 households. The following census in 2011 counted 2,069 people in 573 households. The 2016 census measured the population of the village as 2,221 people in 692 households.
