= Bushkan =

City in Bushehr province, Iran

Bushkan Persian: بوشكان
- City
- Location within Iran
- Coordinates: 28°49′47″N 51°41′59″E
- Country: Iran
- Province: Bushehr
- County: Dashtestan
- District: Bushkan
- Established as a city: 2012

Population (2016)
  - Total: 2,135
- Time zone: UTC+3:30 (IRST)

Bushkan (Persian: بوشكان) (Note: Also romanized as Booshakan and Būshkān; also known as Būshgān) is a city in Bushkan District of Dashtestan County, Bushehr province, Iran, serving as the administrative center for Bushkan Rural District.

== Demographics ==
=== Population ===
At the time of the 2006 National Census, the city's population was 2,337 in 513 households, when it was a village in Bushkan Rural District. The following census in 2011 counted 2,279 people in 581 households. The 2016 census measured the population of the city as 2,135 people in 603 households, by which time the Bushkan had been converted to a city.

== See also ==
Media related to Bushkan at Wikimedia Commons
