= Ali Hoseyna, Sistan and Baluchestan =

Ali Hoseyna علي حسينا
- Village
- Location within Iran
- Coordinates: 31°07′10″N 61°46′43″E
- Country: Iran
- Province: Sistan and Baluchestan
- County: Hirmand
- Bakhsh: Central
- Rural District: Dust Mohammad

Population (2006)
  - Total: 636
- Time zone: UTC+3:30 (IRST)
  - Summer (DST): UTC+4:30 (IRDT)

Ali Hoseyna (Persian: علي حسينا, also Romanized as ‘Alī Ḩoseynā; also known as Deh-e ‘Alī Ḩoseynā) is a village in Dust Mohammad Rural District, in the Central District of Hirmand County, Sistan and Baluchestan Province, Iran. At the 2006 census, its population was 636, in 136 families.
