= Deh Nevoiyeh, Kerman =

Deh Nevoiyeh ده نوئيه
- Village
- Location within Iran
- Coordinates: 30°20′53″N 56°46′14″E
- Country: Iran
- Province: Kerman
- County: Kerman
- Bakhsh: Central
- Rural District: Ekhtiarabad

Population (2006)
  - Total: 118
- Time zone: UTC+3:30 (IRST)
  - Summer (DST): UTC+4:30 (IRDT)

Deh Nevoiyeh (Persian: ده نوئيه, also Romanized as Deh Nevo’īyeh, Dahnū’īyeh, Dehnoo’eyeh, and Deh Now’īyeh; also known as Dehnow and Dahna) is a village in Ekhtiarabad Rural District, in the Central District of Kerman County, Kerman Province, Iran. At the 2006 census, its population was 118, in 35 families.
