= Darestan, Ravar =

Darestan دارستان
- Village
- Location within Iran
- Coordinates: 30°54′10″N 56°57′15″E
- Country: Iran
- Province: Kerman
- County: Ravar
- Bakhsh: Central
- Rural District: Ravar

Population (2006)
  - Total: 83
- Time zone: UTC+3:30 (IRST)
  - Summer (DST): UTC+4:30 (IRDT)

Darestan (Persian: دارستان, also Romanized as Dārestān; also known as Darestan Koohpayeh) is a village in Ravar Rural District, in the Central District of Ravar County, Kerman Province, Iran. At the 2006 census, its population was 83, in 33 families.
