= Bushkan-e Mirzai =

Bushkan-e Mirzai بوشكان ميرزايي
- Village
- Location within Iran
- Coordinates: 29°43′05″N 51°31′05″E
- Country: Iran
- Province: Fars
- County: Kazerun
- Bakhsh: Central
- Rural District: Deris

Population (2006)
  - Total: 88
- Time zone: UTC+3:30 (IRST)
  - Summer (DST): UTC+4:30 (IRDT)

Bushkan-e Mirzai (Persian: بوشكان ميرزايي, also Romanized as Būshkān-e Mīrzā’ī; also known as Būshegān, Būshgān, Būshgān-e Mīrzā’ī, and Būshīkān-e Mīrzā’ī) is a village in Deris Rural District, in the Central District of Kazerun County, Fars province, Iran. At the 2006 census, its population was 88, in 21 families.
