= Bafq =

City in Yazd province, Iran

Bafq Persian: بافق
- City
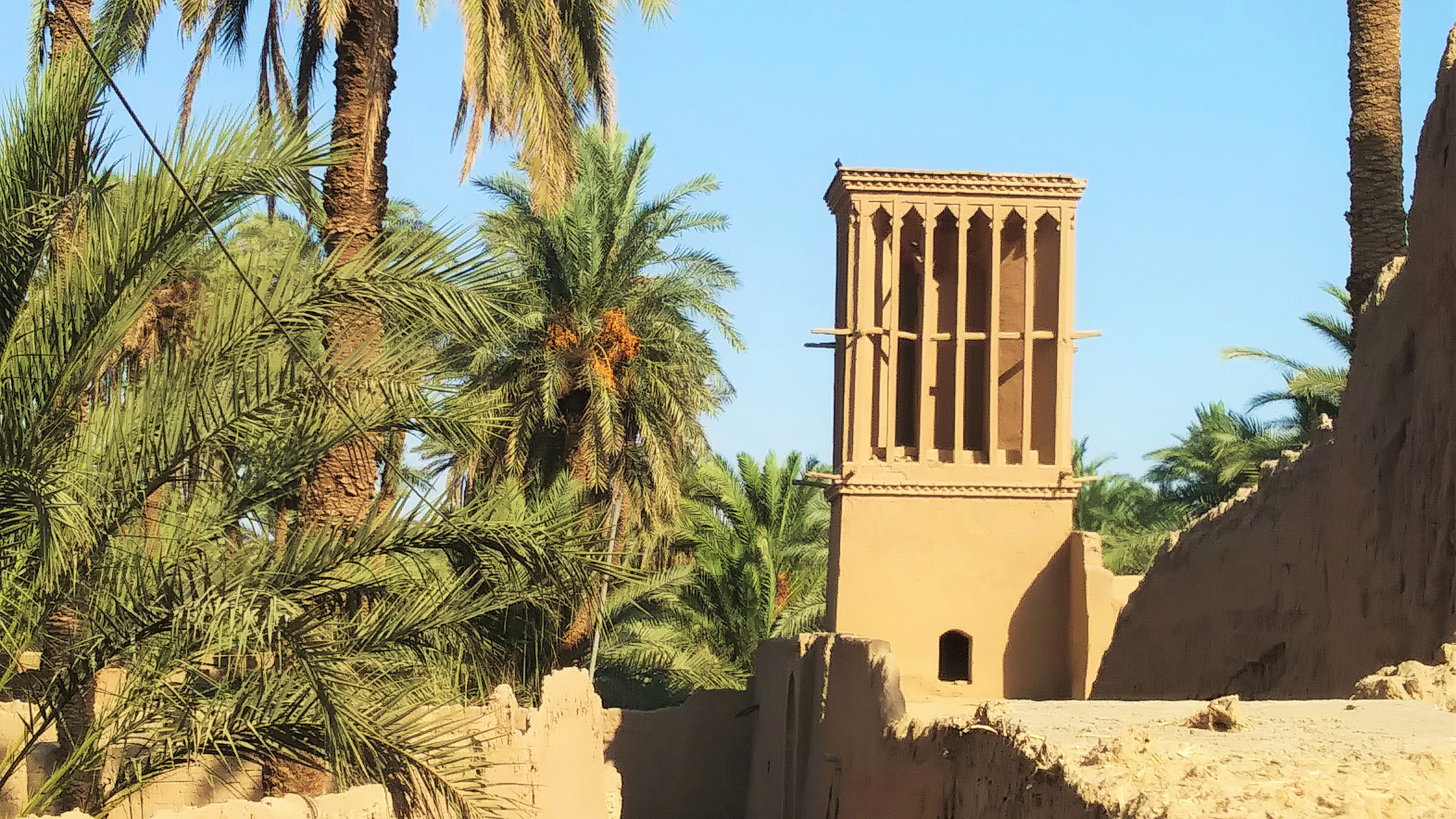

- Location within Iran
- Coordinates: 31°36′18″N 55°24′20″E
- Country: Iran
- Province: Yazd
- County: Bafq
- District: Central

Population (2016)
  - Total: 45,453
- Time zone: UTC+3:30 (IRST)

Bafq (Persian: بافق) (Note: Also romanised as Bāfq) is a city in the Central District of Bafq County, Yazd province, Iran, serving as capital of both the county and the district. The record high temperature of 49.3 °C (120.7 °F) was registered on 25 July 2025.

== Demographics ==
=== Population ===
At the time of the 2006 National Census, the city's population was 30,867 in 7,919 households. The following census in 2011 counted 33,882 people in 9,895 households. The 2016 census measured the population of the city as 45,453 people in 13,454 households.
