= Gazestan, Isfahan =

Gazestan گزستان
- Village
- Location within Iran
- Coordinates: 33°17′10″N 52°28′50″E
- Country: Iran
- Province: Isfahan
- County: Ardestan
- Bakhsh: Central
- Rural District: Kachu

Population (2006)
  - Total: 10
- Time zone: UTC+3:30 (IRST)
  - Summer (DST): UTC+4:30 (IRDT)

Gazestan (Persian: گزستان, also Romanized as Gazestān) is a village in Kachu Rural District, in the Central District of Ardestan County, Isfahan Province, Iran. At the 2006 census, its population was 10, in 6 families.
