= Bushkan-e Deylami =

Bushkan-e Deylami بوشكان ديلمي
- Village
- Location within Iran
- Coordinates: 29°43′22″N 51°30′42″E
- Country: Iran
- Province: Fars
- County: Kazerun
- Bakhsh: Chenar Shahijan
- Rural District: Anarestan

Population (2006)
  - Total: 656
- Time zone: UTC+3:30 (IRST)
  - Summer (DST): UTC+4:30 (IRDT)

Bushkan-e Deylami (Persian: بوشكان ديلمي, also Romanized as Būshkān-e Deylamī; also known as Būshegān-e Deylamī, Būshgān, Būshgān-e Deylamī, and Būshīkān-e Deylamī) is a village in Anarestan Rural District, Chenar Shahijan District, Kazerun County, Fars province, Iran. At the 2006 census, its population was 656, in 161 families.
