= Bishgan =

Iranian village

Bishgan بيشگان
- Village
- Location within Iran
- Coordinates: 34°36′17″N 45°45′54″E
- Country: Iran
- Province: Kermanshah
- County: Sarpol-e Zahab
- Bakhsh: Central
- Rural District: Dasht-e Zahab

Population (2006)
  - Total: 38
- Time zone: UTC+3:30 (IRST)
  - Summer (DST): UTC+4:30 (IRDT)

Bishgan (Persian: بيشگان, also Romanized as Bīshgān; also known as Bashgān, Bayānī, and Beyānī) is a village in Dasht-e Zahab Rural District, in the Central District of Sarpol-e Zahab County, Kermanshah Province, Iran. At the 2006 census, its population was 38, in 7 families.
