= Qaleh-ye Bala, Kerman =

Qaleh-ye Bala قلعه بالا
- Village
- Location within Iran
- Coordinates: 29°08′33″N 58°38′48″E
- Country: Iran
- Province: Kerman
- County: Bam
- Bakhsh: Central
- Rural District: Kork and Nartich

Population (2006)
  - Total: 27
- Time zone: UTC+3:30 (IRST)
  - Summer (DST): UTC+4:30 (IRDT)

Qaleh-ye Bala (Persian: قلعه بالا, also Romanized as Qal‘eh-ye Bālā; also known as Dārestān-e Bālā, Qal‘eh-ey Bālā ī, and Qal‘eh-ye Bālā’ī) is a village in Kork and Nartich Rural District, in the Central District of Bam County, Kerman Province, Iran. At the 2006 census, its population was 27, in 6 families.
