= Bushkan Rural District =

Rural district in Bushehr province, Iran

Bushkan Rural District Persian: دهستان بوشكان
- Rural District
- Location within Iran
- Coordinates: 28°51′N 51°44′E
- Country: Iran
- Province: Bushehr
- County: Dashtestan
- District: Bushkan
- Established: 2001
- Capital: Bushkan

Population (2016)
  - Total: 2,434
- Time zone: UTC+3:30 (IRST)

Bushkan Rural District (Persian: دهستان بوشكان) is in Bushkan District of Dashtestan County, Bushehr province, Iran. It is administered from the city of Bushkan.

== Demographics ==
=== Population ===
At the time of the 2006 National Census, the rural district's population was 4,409 in 960 households. There were 4,181 inhabitants in 1,075 households at the following census of 2011. The 2016 census measured the population of the rural district as 2,434 in 680 households. The most populous of its nine villages was Nurabad, with 689 people.

=== Other villages in the rural district ===
- Emamzadeh-ye Bedeh
- Hajjiabad
- Hoseynabad
- Ilshahr
- Mansurabad
- Sholdan
