= Bashgan, Fars =

Bashgan بشگان
- Village
- Location within Iran
- Coordinates: 30°03′36″N 52°26′24″E
- Country: Iran
- Province: Fars
- County: Sepidan
- Bakhsh: Beyza
- Rural District: Banesh

Population (2006)
  - Total: 140
- Time zone: UTC+3:30 (IRST)
  - Summer (DST): UTC+4:30 (IRDT)

Bashgan (Persian: بشگان, also Romanized as Bashgān; also known as Būshkān) is a village in Banesh Rural District, Beyza District, Sepidan County, Fars province, Iran. At the 2006 census, its population was 140, in 31 families.
