= Kushk Rural District (Bafq County) =

Rural district in Yazd province, Iran

Kushk Rural District Persian: دهستان كوشك
- Rural District
- Location within Iran
- Coordinates: 31°50′57″N 55°42′12″E
- Country: Iran
- Province: Yazd
- County: Bafq
- District: Central
- Capital: Kushk

Population (2016)
  - Total: 408
- Time zone: UTC+3:30 (IRST)

Kushk Rural District (Persian: دهستان كوشك) is in the Central District of Bafq County, Yazd province, Iran. Its capital is the village of Kushk.

== Demographics ==
=== Population ===
At the time of the 2006 National Census, the rural district's population was 553 in 184 households. There were 1,119 inhabitants in 366 households at the following census of 2011. The 2016 census measured the population of the rural district as 408 in 127 households. The most populous of its 68 villages was Kushk, with 139 people.
