= Sabzdasht Rural District (Bafq County) =

Rural district in Yazd province, Iran

Sabzdasht Rural District Persian: دهستان سبزدشت
- Rural District
- Location within Iran
- Coordinates: 31°32′38″N 55°56′57″E
- Country: Iran
- Province: Yazd
- County: Bafq
- District: Central
- Capital: Basab

Population (2016)
  - Total: 1,382
- Time zone: UTC+3:30 (IRST)

Sabzdasht Rural District (Persian: دهستان سبزدشت) is in the Central District of Bafq County, Yazd province, Iran. Its capital is the village of Basab.

== Demographics ==
=== Population ===
At the time of the 2006 National Census, the rural district's population was 1,641 in 565 households. There were 2,617 inhabitants in 869 households at the following census of 2011. The 2016 census measured the population of the rural district as 1,382 in 530 households. The most populous of its 40 villages was Sheytur, with 258 people.
