= Bushkan District =

District in Bushehr province, Iran

Bushkan District Persian: بخش بوشکان
- District
- Location within Iran
- Coordinates: 28°55′N 51°39′E
- Country: Iran
- Province: Bushehr
- County: Dashtestan
- Established: 2001
- Capital: Kalameh

Population (2016)
  - Total: 12,943
- Time zone: UTC+3:30 (IRST)

Bushkan District (Persian: بخش بوشکان) is in Dashtestan County, Bushehr province, Iran. Its capital is the city of Kalameh.

== History ==
The village of Bushkan was converted to a city in 2012.

== Demographics ==
=== Population ===
At the time of the 2006 National Census, the district's population was 12,242 in 2,721 households. The following census in 2011 counted 11,915 people in 3,109 households. The 2016 census measured the population of the district as 12,943 inhabitants living in 3,776 households.

=== Administrative divisions ===
Bushkan District Population
Administrative Divisions	2006	2011	2016
Bushkan RD	4,409	4,181	2,434
Poshtkuh RD	5,896	5,570	5,911
Bushkan (city)			2,135
Kalameh (city)	1,937	2,164	2,463
Total	12,242	11,915	12,943
RD = Rural District
