= Central District (Bafq County) =

District in Yazd province, Iran

Central District (Bafq County) Persian: بخش مرکزی شهرستان بافق
- District
- Location within Iran
- Coordinates: 31°38′48″N 55°27′50″E
- Country: Iran
- Province: Yazd
- County: Bafq
- Capital: Bafq

Population (2016)
  - Total: 50,845
- Time zone: UTC+3:30 (IRST)

The Central District of Bafq County (Persian: بخش مرکزی شهرستان بافق) is in Yazd province, Iran. Its capital is the city of Bafq.

== Demographics ==
=== Population ===
At the time of the 2006 National Census, the district's population was 36,930 in 9,743 households. The following census in 2011 counted 41,876 people in 12,288 households. The 2016 census measured the population of the district as 50,845 inhabitants in 15,156 households.

=== Administrative divisions ===
Central District (Bafq County) Population
Administrative Divisions	2006	2011	2016
Kushk RD	553	1,119	408
Mobarakeh RD	3,869	4,258	3,602
Sabzdasht RD	1,641	2,617	1,382
Bafq (city)	30,867	33,882	45,453
Total	36,930	41,876	50,845
RD = Rural District
