= Bafq County =

County in Yazd province, Iran

Bafq County Persian: شهرستان بافق
- County
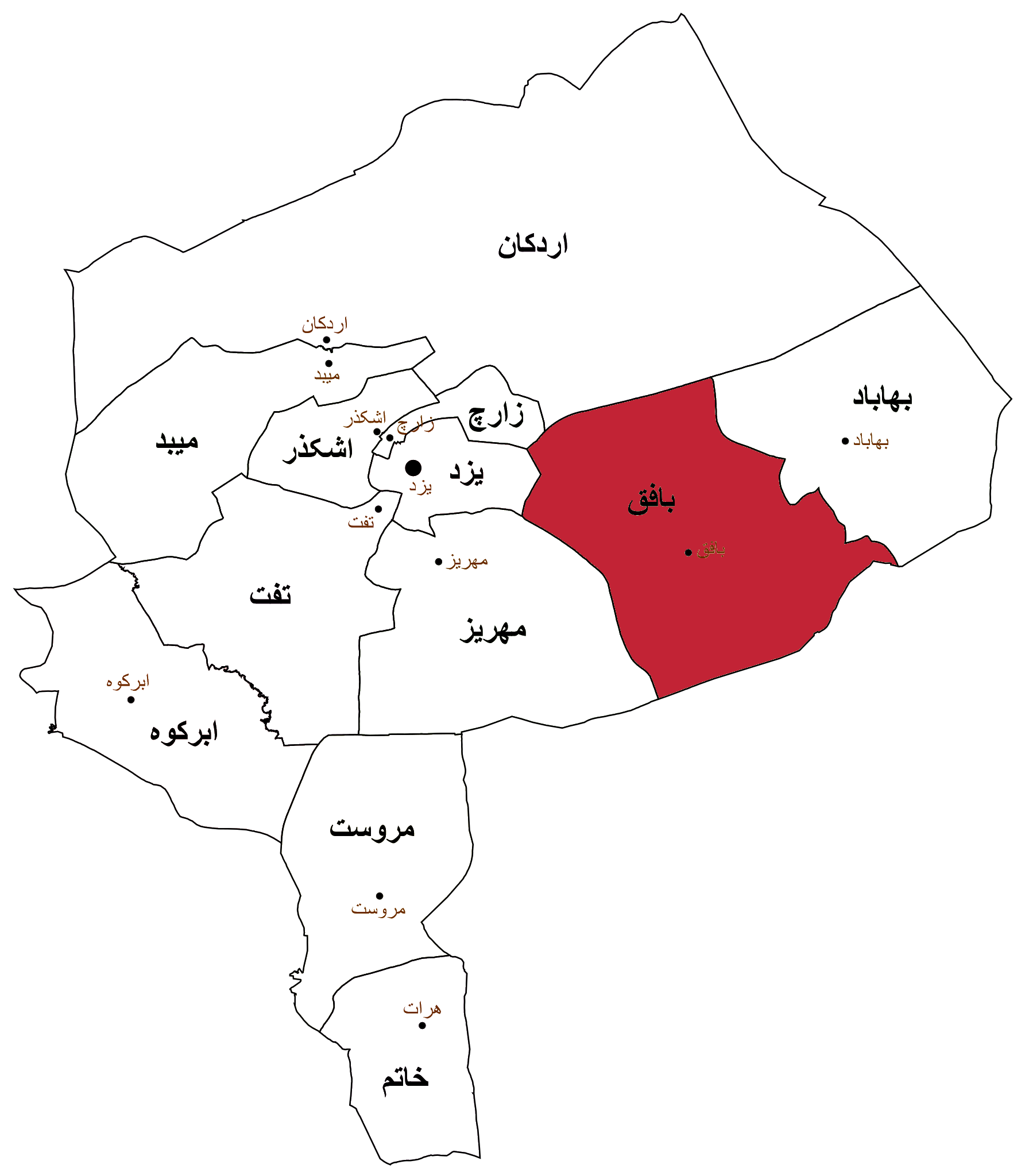
- Location of Bafq County in Yazd province

- Location of Yazd province in Iran
- Coordinates: 31°39′N 55°27′E
- Country: Iran
- Province: Yazd
- Capital: Bafq
- Districts: Central

Population (2016)
  - Total: 50,845
- Time zone: UTC+3:30 (IRST)

Bafq County (Persian: شهرستان بافق) is in Yazd province, Iran. Its capital is the city of Bafq.

== History ==
After the 2006 National Census, Behabad District was separated from the county in the establishment of Behabad County.

== Demographics ==
=== Population ===
At the time of the 2006 census, the county's population was 51,507 in 13,307 households. The following census in 2011 counted 41,876 people in 12,288 households. The 2016 census measured the population of the county as 50,845 in 15,156 households.

=== Administrative divisions ===
Bafq County's population history and administrative structure over three consecutive censuses are shown in the following table.

Bafq County Population
Administrative Divisions	2006	2011	2016
Central District	36,930	41,876	50,845
Kushk RD	553	1,119	408
Mobarakeh RD	3,869	4,258	3,602
Sabzdasht RD	1,641	2,617	1,382
Bafq (city)	30,867	33,882	45,453
Behabad District (Note: Transferred to Behabad County)	14,577		
Asfyj RD	2,070		
Banestan RD	1,523		
Jolgeh RD	3,785		
Behabad (city)	7,199		
Total	51,507	41,876	50,845
RD = Rural District

== See also ==
Media related to Bafq County at Wikimedia Commons
