= Shahbaz Khani =

Village in Fars province, Iran

Shahbaz Khani Persian: شهبازخاني
- Village
- Location within Iran
- Coordinates: 29°36′38″N 51°19′48″E
- Country: Iran
- Province: Fars
- County: Kazerun
- District: Khesht
- Rural District: Emamzadeh Mohammad

Population (2016)
  - Total: 801
- Time zone: UTC+3:30 (IRST)

Shahbaz Khani (Persian: شهبازخاني) (Note: Also romanized as Shahbāz Khānī and Shahbāzkhānī) is a village in, and the capital of, Emamzadeh Mohammad Rural District of Khesht District, Kazerun County, Fars province, Iran.

== Demographics ==
=== Population ===
At the time of the 2006 National Census, the village's population was 967 in 178 households, when it was in Khesht Rural District (Note: Renamed Konartakhteh Rural District) of Khesht and Kamaraj District. (Note: Renamed Konartakhteh and Kamaraj District) The following census in 2011 counted 817 people in 229 households, by which time the city of Khesht and other parts were separated from the district in the formation of Khesht District. Shahbaz Khani was transferred to Emamzadeh Mohammad Rural District created in the new district. The 2016 census measured the population of the village as 801 people in 236 households. It was the most populous village in its rural district.
