= Bikhak-e Joruq =

Bikhak-e Joruq بیخک جروق
- Village
- Location within Iran
- Coordinates: 29°24′00″N 51°58′21″E
- Country: Iran
- Province: Fars
- County: Kazerun
- Bakhsh: Jereh and Baladeh
- Rural District: Famur

Population (2006)
  - Total: 689
- Time zone: UTC+3:30 (IRST)
  - Summer (DST): UTC+4:30 (IRDT)

Bikhak-e Joruq (Persian: بیخک جروق, also Romanized as Bīkhak-e Jorūq; also known as Bīkhak) is a village in Famur Rural District, Jereh and Baladeh District, Kazerun County, Fars province, Iran. At the 2006 census, its population was 689, in 143 families.
