= Ahmadabad, Kazerun =

Ahmadabad احمداباد
- Village
- Location within Iran
- Coordinates: 29°36′01″N 51°24′06″E
- Country: Iran
- Province: Fars
- County: Kazerun
- Bakhsh: Khesht
- Rural District: Khesht

Population (2006)
  - Total: 113
- Time zone: UTC+3:30 (IRST)
  - Summer (DST): UTC+4:30 (IRDT)

Ahmadabad (Persian: احمداباد, also Romanized as Aḩmadābād; also known as Aḩmadābād-e Şafī Khānī) is a village in Khesht Rural District, Khesht District, Kazerun County, Fars province, Iran. At the 2006 census, its population was 113, in 24 families.
