= Tall-e Bidkan =

Tall-e Bidkan تل بيدكان
- Village
- Location within Iran
- Coordinates: 29°15′06″N 51°57′07″E
- Country: Iran
- Province: Fars
- County: Kazerun
- Bakhsh: Jereh and Baladeh
- Rural District: Jereh

Population (2006)
  - Total: 83
- Time zone: UTC+3:30 (IRST)
  - Summer (DST): UTC+4:30 (IRDT)

Tall-e Bidkan (Persian: تل بيدكان, also Romanized as Tall-e Bīdkān; also known as Bīdkān-e Khān Neshīn) is a village in Jereh Rural District, Jereh and Baladeh District, Kazerun County, Fars province, Iran. At the 2006 census, its population was 83, in 15 families.
