= Parishan =

Parishan پريشان
- Village
- Location within Iran
- Coordinates: 29°31′47″N 51°49′14″E
- Country: Iran
- Province: Fars
- County: Kazerun
- Bakhsh: Jereh and Baladeh
- Rural District: Famur

Population (2006)
  - Total: 89
- Time zone: UTC+3:30 (IRST)
  - Summer (DST): UTC+4:30 (IRDT)

Parishan (Persian: پريشان, also Romanized as Parīshān) is a village in Famur Rural District, Jereh and Baladeh District, Kazerun County, Fars province, Iran. At the 2006 census, its population was 89, in 21 families.
