= Korehi, Kazerun =

Korehi كره اي
- Village
- Location within Iran
- Coordinates: 29°35′42″N 51°22′33″E
- Country: Iran
- Province: Fars
- County: Kazerun
- Bakhsh: Khesht
- Rural District: Khesht

Population (2006)
  - Total: 270
- Time zone: UTC+3:30 (IRST)
  - Summer (DST): UTC+4:30 (IRDT)

Korehi (Persian: كره اي, also Romanized as Koreh’ī and Korehee) is a village in Khesht Rural District, Khesht District, Kazerun County, Fars province, Iran. At the 2006 census, its population was 270, in 62 families.
