= Boneh-ye Seyyed Mohammad Reza =

Boneh-ye Seyyed Mohammad Reza بنه سيدمحمدرضا
- Village
- Location within Iran
- Coordinates: 29°34′13″N 51°23′43″E
- Country: Iran
- Province: Fars
- County: Kazerun
- Bakhsh: Khesht
- Rural District: Khesht

Population (2006)
  - Total: 632
- Time zone: UTC+3:30 (IRST)
  - Summer (DST): UTC+4:30 (IRDT)

Boneh-ye Seyyed Mohammad Reza (Persian: بنه سيدمحمدرضا, also Romanized as Boneh-ye Seyyed Moḩammad Reẕā) is a village in Khesht Rural District, Khesht District, Kazerun County, Fars province, Iran. At the 2006 census, its population was 632, in 136 families.
