= Emamzadeh Ali, Fars =

Emamzadeh Ali امامزاده علي
- Village
- Location within Iran
- Coordinates: 29°32′24″N 51°20′26″E
- Country: Iran
- Province: Fars
- County: Kazerun
- Bakhsh: Khesht
- Rural District: Khesht

Population (2006)
  - Total: 264
- Time zone: UTC+3:30 (IRST)
  - Summer (DST): UTC+4:30 (IRDT)

Emamzadeh Ali (Persian: امامزاده علي, also Romanized as Emāmzādeh 'Alī; also known as Imamzādeh) is a village in Khesht Rural District, Khesht District, Kazerun County, Fars province, Iran. At the 2006 census, its population was 264, in 51 families.
