= Buraki-ye Olya =

Village in Fars province, Iran

Boorekey Persian: بوركي
- Village
- Location within Iran
- Coordinates: 29°31′13″N 51°21′49″E
- Country: Iran
- Province: Fars
- County: Kazerun
- District: Khesht
- Rural District: Boorekey

Population (2016)
  - Total: 2,414
- Time zone: UTC+3:30 (IRST)

Boorekey-ye Olya (Persian: بوركي عليا) (Note: Also romanized as Boorekey-ye ‘Olyā; also known as Boorekey, Boorekey Bālā, and Boorekey-ye Bālā) is a village in, and the capital of, Boorekey Rural District of Khesht District, Kazerun County, Fars province, Iran.

== Demographics ==
=== Population ===
At the time of the 2006 National Census, the village's population was 2,944 in 678 households, when it was in Khesht Rural District (Note: Renamed Konartakhteh Rural District) of Khesht and Kamaraj District. (Note: Renamed Konartakhteh and Kamaraj District) The following census in 2011 counted 2,268 people in 653 households, by which time the city of Khesht and other parts were separated from the district in the formation of Khesht District. Buraki-ye Olya was transferred to Buraki Rural District created in the new district. The 2016 census measured the population of the village as 2,414 people in 741 households. It was the most populous village in its rural district.
