= Puskan =

Puskan پوسكان
- Village
- Location within Iran
- Coordinates: 29°28′57″N 51°40′17″E
- Country: Iran
- Province: Fars
- County: Kazerun
- Bakhsh: Jereh and Baladeh
- Rural District: Dadin

Population (2016)
  - Total: 222
- Time zone: UTC+3:30 (IRST)
  - Summer (DST): UTC+4:30 (IRDT)

Puskan (Persian: پوسكان, also Romanized as Pūskān; also known as Pāras Kān, Parskān, Pārskhān, Postkān, Pūsgān, Pūshkān, and Pūstgān) is a village in Dadin Rural District, Jereh and Baladeh District, Kazerun County, Fars province, Iran. At the 2016 census, its population was 222, in 62 families.
