= Zarrin Kuyeh =

Zarrin Kuyeh زرين كويه
- Village
- Location within Iran
- Coordinates: 29°16′49″N 51°57′05″E
- Country: Iran
- Province: Fars
- County: Kazerun
- Bakhsh: Jereh and Baladeh
- Rural District: Jereh

Population (2006)
  - Total: 278
- Time zone: UTC+3:30 (IRST)
  - Summer (DST): UTC+4:30 (IRDT)

Zarrin Kuyeh (Persian: زرين كويه, also Romanized as Zarrīn Kūyeh) is a village in Jereh Rural District, Jereh and Baladeh District, Kazerun County, Fars province, Iran. At the 2006 census, its population was 278, in 55 families.
