= Zohrababad =

Zohrababad ظهراب اباد
- Village
- Location within Iran
- Coordinates: 29°23′00″N 51°46′00″E
- Country: Iran
- Province: Fars
- County: Kazerun
- Bakhsh: Jereh and Baladeh
- Rural District: Dadin

Population (2006)
  - Total: 153
- Time zone: UTC+3:30 (IRST)
  - Summer (DST): UTC+4:30 (IRDT)

Zohrababad (Persian: ظهراب اباد, also Romanized as Z̧ohrābābād) is a village in Dadin Rural District, Jereh and Baladeh District, Kazerun County, Fars province, Iran. At the 2006 census, its population was 153, in 33 families.
