= Quri =

Quri قوري
- Village
- Country: Iran
- Province: Fars
- County: Kazerun
- Bakhsh: Khesht
- Rural District: Khesht

Population (2006)
  - Total: 148
- Time zone: UTC+3:30 (IRST)
  - Summer (DST): UTC+4:30 (IRDT)

Quri (Persian: قوري, also Romanized as Qūrī) is a village in Khesht Rural District, Khesht District, Kazerun County, Fars province, Iran. At the 2006 census, its population was 148.
