= Emarat, Kazerun =

Emarat, Iran عمارت
- Village
- Location within Iran
- Coordinates: 29°39′24″N 51°23′03″E
- Country: Iran
- Province: Fars
- County: Kazerun
- Bakhsh: Khesht
- Rural District: Khesht

Population (2006)
  - Total: 62
- Time zone: UTC+3:30 (IRST)
  - Summer (DST): UTC+4:30 (IRDT)

Emarat (Persian: عمارت, also Romanized as 'Emārat and 'Emāret; also known as 'Emārat-e Mollā-ye Anār, Imārat, and Mollā Anār) is a village in Khesht Rural District, Khesht District, Kazerun County, Fars province, Iran. At the 2006 census, its population was 62, in 15 families.
