= Qasr-e Ali =

Qasr-e Ali قصرعلي
- Village
- Location within Iran
- Coordinates: 29°15′23″N 51°57′56″E
- Country: Iran
- Province: Fars
- County: Kazerun
- Bakhsh: Jereh and Baladeh
- Rural District: Jereh

Population (2006)
  - Total: 577
- Time zone: UTC+3:30 (IRST)
  - Summer (DST): UTC+4:30 (IRDT)

Qasr-e Ali (Persian: قصرعلي, also Romanized as Qaşr-e 'Alī) is a village in Jereh Rural District, Jereh and Baladeh District, Kazerun County, Fars province, Iran. At the 2006 census, its population was 577, in 125 families.
