= Borj-e Seyyed =

Borj-e Seyyed برج سيد
- Village
- Location within Iran
- Coordinates: 29°35′41″N 51°22′31″E
- Country: Iran
- Province: Fars
- County: Kazerun
- Bakhsh: Khesht
- Rural District: Khesht

Population (2006)
  - Total: 281
- Time zone: UTC+3:30 (IRST)
  - Summer (DST): UTC+4:30 (IRDT)

Borj-e Seyyed (Persian: برج سيد; also known as Qal‘eh-i-Saiyid and Qal‘eh-ye Seyyed) is a village in Khesht Rural District, Khesht District, Kazerun County, Fars province, Iran. At the 2006 census, its population was 281, in 65 families.
