= Shib Tang =

Shib Tang شيب تنگ
- Village
- Location within Iran
- Coordinates: 29°14′37″N 52°05′37″E
- Country: Iran
- Province: Fars
- County: Kazerun
- Bakhsh: Jereh and Baladeh
- Rural District: Jereh

Population (2006)
  - Total: 185
- Time zone: UTC+3:30 (IRST)
  - Summer (DST): UTC+4:30 (IRDT)

Shib Tang (Persian: شيب تنگ, also Romanized as Shīb Tang and Shīb-e Tang) is a village in Jereh Rural District, Jereh and Baladeh District, Kazerun County, Fars province, Iran. At the 2006 census, its population was 185, in 34 families.
