= Gabdegah =

Gabdegah گابدگاه
- Village
- Location within Iran
- Coordinates: 29°15′16″N 52°04′19″E
- Country: Iran
- Province: Fars
- County: Kazerun
- Bakhsh: Jereh and Baladeh
- Rural District: Jereh

Population (2006)
  - Total: 98
- Time zone: UTC+3:30 (IRST)
  - Summer (DST): UTC+4:30 (IRDT)

Gabdegah (Persian: گابدگاه, also Romanized as Gābdegāh; also known as Gowdehgāv, Gowdgāh, and Gūdgāh) is a village in Jereh Rural District, Jereh and Baladeh District, Kazerun County, Fars province, Iran. At the 2006 census, its population was 98, in 21 families.
