= Molla Arreh =

Molla Arreh ملااره
- Village
- Location within Iran
- Coordinates: 29°29′00″N 51°47′42″E
- Country: Iran
- Province: Fars
- County: Kazerun
- Bakhsh: Jereh and Baladeh
- Rural District: Famur

Population (2006)
  - Total: 1,105
- Time zone: UTC+3:30 (IRST)
  - Summer (DST): UTC+4:30 (IRDT)

Molla Arreh (Persian: ملااره, also Romanized as Mollā Arreh, Mollā Areh, and Mollā-ye Areh; also known as Mol Yareh and Mulla Areh) is a village in Famur Rural District, Jereh and Baladeh District, Kazerun County, Fars province, Iran. At the 2006 census, its population was 1,105, in 256 families.
