= Dadin =

Dadin (Persian: دادين) may refer to:

- Dadin-e Olya
- Dadin-e Sofla
- Dadin Rural District
- The Tatar-born Russian dissident Ildar Dadin
