= Sakhteman-e Hajj Parviz =

Sakhteman-e Hajj Parviz ساختمان حاج پرويز
- Village
- Country: Iran
- Province: Fars
- County: Kazerun
- Bakhsh: Jereh and Baladeh
- Rural District: Dadin

Population (2006)
  - Total: 36
- Time zone: UTC+3:30 (IRST)
  - Summer (DST): UTC+4:30 (IRDT)

Sakhteman-e Hajj Parviz (Persian: ساختمان حاج پرويز, also Romanized as Sākhetmān-e Ḩājj Parvīz) is a village in Dadin Rural District, Jereh and Baladeh District, Kazerun County, Fars province, Iran. At the 2006 census, its population was 36, in 7 families.
