= Qaleh-ye Narenji =

Qaleh-ye Narenji قلعهٔ نارنجی
- Village
- Location within Iran
- Coordinates: 29°28′07″N 51°55′11″E
- Country: Iran
- Province: Fars
- County: Kazerun
- Bakhsh: Jereh and Baladeh
- Rural District: Famur

Population (2006)
  - Total: 354
- Time zone: UTC+3:30 (IRST)
  - Summer (DST): UTC+4:30 (IRDT)

Qaleh-ye Narenji (Persian: قلعهٔ نارنجی, also Romanized as Qal‘eh-ye Nārenjī) is a village in Famur Rural District, Jereh and Baladeh District, Kazerun County, Fars province, Iran. It is located about 431 mi (or 694 km) south of Tehran. At the 2006 census, its population was 354, in 70 families.
