= Banaf =

Banaf بناف
- Village
- Location within Iran
- Coordinates: 29°33′52″N 51°31′12″E
- Country: Iran
- Province: Fars
- County: Kazerun
- Bakhsh: Kamaraj and Konartakhteh
- Rural District: Kamaraj

Population (2006)
  - Total: 795
- Time zone: UTC+3:30 (IRST)
  - Summer (DST): UTC+4:30 (IRDT)

Banaf (Persian: بناف, also Romanized as Banāf; also known as Banāv) is a village in Kamaraj Rural District, Kamaraj and Konartakhteh District, Kazerun County, Fars province, Iran. At the 2006 census, its population was 795, in 179 families.
