= Sisakhti-ye Sofla =

Sisakhti-ye Sofla سي سختي سفلي
- Village
- Location within Iran
- Coordinates: 29°28′56″N 51°53′51″E
- Country: Iran
- Province: Fars
- County: Kazerun
- Bakhsh: Jereh and Baladeh
- Rural District: Famur

Population (2006)
  - Total: 169
- Time zone: UTC+3:30 (IRST)
  - Summer (DST): UTC+4:30 (IRDT)

Sisakhti-ye Sofla (Persian: سي سختي سفلي, also Romanized as Sīsakhtī-ye Soflá; also known as Sīsakhtī) is a village in Famur Rural District, Jereh and Baladeh District, Kazerun County, Fars province, Iran. At the 2006 census, its population was 169, in 38 families.
