= Tall Saman =

Tall Saman تل سامان
- Village
- Location within Iran
- Coordinates: 29°16′00″N 51°43′46″E
- Country: Iran
- Province: Fars
- County: Kazerun
- Bakhsh: Jereh and Baladeh
- Rural District: Dadin

Population (2006)
  - Total: 562
- Time zone: UTC+3:30 (IRST)
  - Summer (DST): UTC+4:30 (IRDT)

Tall Saman (Persian: تل سامان, also Romanized as Tall Sāmān) is a village in Dadin Rural District, Jereh and Baladeh District, Kazerun County, Fars province, Iran. At the 2006 census, its population was 562, in 117 families.
