= Chahar Borj, Fars =

Chahar Borj چهاربرج
- Village
- Location within Iran
- Coordinates: 29°34′21″N 51°21′22″E
- Country: Iran
- Province: Fars
- County: Kazerun
- Bakhsh: Khesht
- Rural District: Khesht

Population (2006)
  - Total: 96
- Time zone: UTC+3:30 (IRST)
  - Summer (DST): UTC+4:30 (IRDT)

Chahar Borj (Persian: چهاربرج, also Romanized as Chahār Borj) is a village in Khesht Rural District, Khesht District, Kazerun County, Fars province, Iran. At the 2006 census, its population was 96, in 21 families.
