= Tall-e Gav =

Tall-e Gav تل گاو
- Village
- Location within Iran
- Coordinates: 29°16′17″N 51°56′13″E
- Country: Iran
- Province: Fars
- County: Kazerun
- Bakhsh: Jereh and Baladeh
- Rural District: Jereh

Population (2006)
  - Total: 608
- Time zone: UTC+3:30 (IRST)
  - Summer (DST): UTC+4:30 (IRDT)

Tall-e Gav (Persian: تل گاو, also Romanizeed as Tall-e Gāv) is a village in Jereh Rural District, Jereh and Baladeh District, Kazerun County, Fars province, Iran. At the 2006 census, its population was 608, in 126 families.
