= Javadabad =

Javadabad (Persian: جوادآباد) may refer to:

== Fars Province ==
- Javadabad, Fars, a village in Kazerun County

== Ilam Province ==
- Javadabad, Ilam, a village in Darreh Shahr County

== Lorestan Province ==
- Javadabad, Delfan, a village in Delfan County
- Javadabad, Selseleh, a village in Selseleh County

== Sistan and Baluchestan Province ==
- Javadabad, Sistan and Baluchestan, a village in Khash County

== Tehran Province ==
- Javadabad, Varamin, a city
- Javadabad District, an administrative subdivision
