= Buraki =

Buraki or Bowraki may refer to:

- Buraki, Kavar, Fars province, Iran
- Buraki Rural District, an administrative division of Kazerun County, Fars province, Iran
- Buraki-ye Olya, Kazerun County, Fars province, Iran
- Buraki-ye Sofla, Kazerun County, Fars province, Iran
- Buraki, Marvdasht, Fars province, Iran
- Buraki, Poland
