= Qalat-e Nilu =

Qalat-e Nilu قلات نيلو
- Village
- Location within Iran
- Coordinates: 29°30′22″N 51°52′44″E
- Country: Iran
- Province: Fars
- County: Kazerun
- Bakhsh: Jereh and Baladeh
- Rural District: Famur

Population (2006)
  - Total: 857
- Time zone: UTC+3:30 (IRST)
  - Summer (DST): UTC+4:30 (IRDT)

Qalat-e Nilu (Persian: قلات نيلو, also Romanized as Qalāt-e Nīlū) is a village in Famur Rural District, Jereh and Baladeh District, Kazerun County, Fars province, Iran. At the 2006 census, its population was 857, in 182 families.
