= Tang-e Gav =

Tang-e Gav تنگ گاو
- Village
- Location within Iran
- Coordinates: 29°24′51″N 51°55′16″E
- Country: Iran
- Province: Fars
- County: Kazerun
- Bakhsh: Jereh and Baladeh
- Rural District: Famur

Population (2006)
  - Total: 220
- Time zone: UTC+3:30 (IRST)
  - Summer (DST): UTC+4:30 (IRDT)

Tang-e Gav (Persian: تنگ گاو, also Romanized as Tang-e Gāv) is a village in Famur Rural District, Jereh and Baladeh District, Kazerun County, Fars province, Iran. At the 2006 census, its population was 220, in 41 families.
