= Bibi Nazkhatun =

Bibi Nazkhatun بي بي نازخاتون
- Village
- Country: Iran
- Province: Fars
- County: Kazerun
- Bakhsh: Khesht
- Rural District: Khesht

Population (2006)
  - Total: 22
- Time zone: UTC+3:30 (IRST)
  - Summer (DST): UTC+4:30 (IRDT)

Bibi Nazkhatun (Persian: بي بي نازخاتون, also Romanized as Bībī Nāzkhātūn) is a village in Khesht Rural District, Khesht District, Kazerun County, Fars province, Iran. At the 2006 census, its population was 22, in 6 families.
