= Ab Mik =

Ab Mik اب ميك
- Village
- Location within Iran
- Coordinates: 29°17′19″N 52°02′33″E
- Country: Iran
- Province: Fars
- County: Kazerun
- Bakhsh: Jereh and Baladeh
- Rural District: Jereh

Population (2006)
  - Total: 114
- Time zone: UTC+3:30 (IRST)
  - Summer (DST): UTC+4:30 (IRDT)

Ab Mik (Persian: اب ميك, also Romanized as Āb Mīk) is a village in Jereh Rural District, Jereh and Baladeh District, Kazerun County, Fars province, Iran. At the 2006 census, its population was 114, in 24 families.
