= Tall-e Sabz =

Tall-e Sabz تل سبز
- Village
- Location within Iran
- Coordinates: 29°21′00″N 51°57′00″E
- Country: Iran
- Province: Fars
- County: Kazerun
- Bakhsh: Jereh and Baladeh
- Rural District: Dadin

Population (2006)
  - Total: 15
- Time zone: UTC+3:30 (IRST)
  - Summer (DST): UTC+4:30 (IRDT)

Tall-e Sabz (Persian: تل سبز) is a village in Dadin Rural District, Jereh and Baladeh District, Kazerun County, Fars province, Iran. At the 2006 census, its population was 15, in 4 families.
