= Amlak =

Amlak املاك
- Village
- Location within Iran
- Coordinates: 29°18′00″N 51°59′00″E
- Country: Iran
- Province: Fars
- County: Kazerun
- Bakhsh: Jereh and Baladeh
- Rural District: Jereh

Population (2006)
  - Total: 55
- Time zone: UTC+3:30 (IRST)
  - Summer (DST): UTC+4:30 (IRDT)

Amlak (Persian: املاك, also Romanized as Amlāk) is a village in Jereh Rural District, Jereh and Baladeh District, Kazerun County, Fars province, Iran. At the 2006 census, its population was 55, in 13 families.
