= Tall-e Shureh =

Tall-e Shureh تل شوره
- Village
- Interactive map of Tall-e Shureh
- Coordinates: 29°25′07″N 51°48′57″E
- Country: Iran
- Province: Fars
- County: Kazerun
- Bakhsh: Jereh and Baladeh
- Rural District: Jereh

Population (2006)
  - Total: 206
- Time zone: UTC+3:30 (IRST)
  - Summer (DST): UTC+4:30 (IRDT)

Tall-e Shureh (Persian: تل شوره, also Romanized as Tall-e Shūreh) is a village in Jereh Rural District, Jereh and Baladeh District, Kazerun County, Fars province, Iran. At the 2006 census, its population was 206, in 45 families.
