= Rudak, Fars =

Rudak رودک
- Village
- Location within Iran
- Coordinates: 29°37′31″N 51°25′57″E
- Country: Iran
- Province: Fars
- County: Kazerun
- Bakhsh: Kamaraj and Konartakhteh
- Rural District: Kamaraj

Population (2006)
  - Total: 17
- Time zone: UTC+3:30 (IRST)
  - Summer (DST): UTC+4:30 (IRDT)

Rudak (Persian: رودک, also Romanized as Rūdak) is a village in Kamaraj Rural District, Kamaraj and Konartakhteh District, Kazerun County, Fars province, Iran. At the 2006 census, its population was 17, in 5 families.
