= Nezamabad, Kazerun =

Nezamabad نظام اباد
- Village
- Location within Iran
- Coordinates: 29°34′55″N 51°22′47″E
- Country: Iran
- Province: Fars
- County: Kazerun
- Bakhsh: Khesht
- Rural District: Khesht

Population (2006)
  - Total: 291
- Time zone: UTC+3:30 (IRST)
  - Summer (DST): UTC+4:30 (IRDT)

Nezamabad (Persian: نظام اباد, also Romanized as Nez̧āmābād) is a village in Khesht Rural District, Khesht District, Kazerun County, Fars province, Iran. At the 2006 census, its population was 291, in 63 families.
