= Kalatun, Fars =

Kalatun كلاتون
- Village
- Location within Iran
- Coordinates: 29°38′20″N 51°22′26″E
- Country: Iran
- Province: Fars
- County: Kazerun
- Bakhsh: Khesht
- Rural District: Khesht

Population (2006)
  - Total: 18
- Time zone: UTC+3:30 (IRST)
  - Summer (DST): UTC+4:30 (IRDT)

Kalatun (Persian: كلاتون, also Romanized as Kalātūn; also known as Kalātū) is a village in Khesht Rural District, Khesht District, Kazerun County, Fars province, Iran. At the 2006 census, its population was 18, in 6 families.
