= Bibimohlat =

Bibimohlat بي بي مهلت
- Village
- Location within Iran
- Coordinates: 29°30′07″N 51°32′08″E
- Country: Iran
- Province: Fars
- County: Kazerun
- Bakhsh: Kamaraj and Konartakhteh
- Rural District: Kamaraj

Population (2006)
  - Total: 393
- Time zone: UTC+3:30 (IRST)
  - Summer (DST): UTC+4:30 (IRDT)

Bibimohlat (Persian: بي بي مهلت, also Romanized as Bībīmohlat) is a village in Kamaraj Rural District, Kamaraj and Konartakhteh District, Kazerun County, Fars province, Iran. At the 2006 census, its population was 393, in 88 families.
