= Emamzadeh Seyyed Mohammad Hoseyn =

Village in Fars, Iran

Emamzadeh Seyyed Mohammad Hoseyn امامزاده سيدمحمدحسين
- Village
- Country: Iran
- Province: Fars
- County: Kazerun
- Bakhsh: Jereh and Baladeh
- Rural District: Jereh

Population (2006)
  - Total: 141
- Time zone: UTC+3:30 (IRST)
  - Summer (DST): UTC+4:30 (IRDT)

Emamzadeh Seyyed Mohammad Hoseyn (Persian: امامزاده سيدمحمدحسين, also Romanized as Emāmzādeh Seyyed Moḩammad Ḩoseyn) is a village in Jereh Rural District, Jereh and Baladeh District, Kazerun County, Fars province, Iran. At the 2006 census, its population was 141, in 27 families.
