= Tall Naqareh =

Tall Naqareh or Tol-e Noqareh (Persian: تل نقاره) may refer to:

- Tall Naqareh, Kazerun
- Tall Naqareh, Mamasani
- Tol-e Noqareh, Mahvarmilani, Mamasani County
