= Hellak =

Hellak هلك
- Village
- Location within Iran
- Coordinates: 29°31′16″N 51°50′22″E
- Country: Iran
- Province: Fars
- County: Kazerun
- Bakhsh: Jereh and Baladeh
- Rural District: Famur

Population (2006)
  - Total: 937
- Time zone: UTC+3:30 (IRST)
  - Summer (DST): UTC+4:30 (IRDT)

Hellak (Persian: هلك, also Romanized as Helak) is a village in Famur Rural District, Jereh and Baladeh District, Kazerun County, Fars province, Iran. At the 2006 census, its population was 937, in 164 families.
