= Nematabad, Kazerun =

Nematabad نعمت اباد
- Village
- Location within Iran
- Coordinates: 29°35′00″N 51°22′10″E
- Country: Iran
- Province: Fars
- County: Kazerun
- Bakhsh: Khesht
- Rural District: Khesht

Population (2006)
  - Total: 101
- Time zone: UTC+3:30 (IRST)
  - Summer (DST): UTC+4:30 (IRDT)

Nematabad (Persian: نعمت اباد, also Romanized as Ne‘matābād; also known as Boneh-ye 'ājjī-ye Moḩammad Taqī, Boneh-ye Hājjī, and Bunneh-i-Hājji) is a village in Khesht Rural District, Khesht District, Kazerun County, Fars province, Iran. At the 2006 census, its population was 101, in 20 families.
