= Nuhi =

Nuhi نوحي
- Village
- Location within Iran
- Coordinates: 29°38′20″N 51°28′47″E
- Country: Iran
- Province: Fars
- County: Kazerun
- Bakhsh: Kamaraj and Konartakhteh
- Rural District: Kamaraj

Population (2006)
  - Total: 316
- Time zone: UTC+3:30 (IRST)
  - Summer (DST): UTC+4:30 (IRDT)

Nuhi (Persian: نوحي, also Romanized as Nūḩī; also known as Kamāraj-e Nū'ī) is a village in Kamaraj Rural District, Kamaraj and Konartakhteh District, Kazerun County, Fars province, Iran. At the 2006 census, its population was 316, in 59 families.
