= Mahall ol Din =

Mahall ol Din محل الدين
- Village
- Location within Iran
- Coordinates: 29°33′52″N 51°23′32″E
- Country: Iran
- Province: Fars
- County: Kazerun
- Bakhsh: Khesht
- Rural District: Khesht

Population (2006)
  - Total: 370
- Time zone: UTC+3:30 (IRST)
  - Summer (DST): UTC+4:30 (IRDT)

Mahall ol Din (Persian: محل الدين, also Romanized as Maḩall ol Dīn and Maḩall od Dīn; also known as Maḩall Dīn, Maḩalled Dīn, and Maḩl od Dīn) is a village in Khesht Rural District, Khesht District, Kazerun County, Fars province, Iran. At the 2006 census, its population was 370, in 83 families.
