= Owlad-e Chelku =

Owlad-e Chelku اولادچلكو
- Village
- Location within Iran
- Coordinates: 29°20′22″N 51°51′26″E
- Country: Iran
- Province: Fars
- County: Kazerun
- Bakhsh: Jereh and Baladeh
- Rural District: Dadin

Population (2006)
  - Total: 96
- Time zone: UTC+3:30 (IRST)
  - Summer (DST): UTC+4:30 (IRDT)

Owlad-e Chelku (Persian: اولادچلكو, also Romanized as Owlād-e Chelkū; also known as Olād-e Chehelkūh) is a village in Dadin Rural District, Jereh and Baladeh District, Kazerun County, Fars province, Iran. At the 2006 census, its population was 96, in 18 families.
