= Chiti, Fars =

Chiti چيتي
- Village
- Location within Iran
- Coordinates: 29°35′40″N 51°18′33″E
- Country: Iran
- Province: Fars
- County: Kazerun
- Bakhsh: Khesht
- Rural District: Khesht

Population (2006)
  - Total: 378
- Time zone: UTC+3:30 (IRST)
  - Summer (DST): UTC+4:30 (IRDT)

Chiti (Persian: چيتي, also Romanized as Chītī; also known as Jītī) is a village in Khesht Rural District, Khesht District, Kazerun County, Fars province, Iran. At the 2006 census, its population was 378, in 70 families.
