= Tang-e Monareh =

Tang-e Monareh تنگ مناره
- Village
- Location within Iran
- Coordinates: 29°30′24″N 51°37′22″E
- Country: Iran
- Province: Fars
- County: Kazerun
- Bakhsh: Kamaraj and Konartakhteh
- Rural District: Kamaraj

Population (2006)
  - Total: 120
- Time zone: UTC+3:30 (IRST)
  - Summer (DST): UTC+4:30 (IRDT)

Tang-e Monareh (Persian: تنگ مناره, also Romanized as Tang-e Monāreh) is a village in Kamaraj Rural District, Kamaraj and Konartakhteh District, Kazerun County, Fars province, Iran. At the 2006 census, its population was 120, in 30 families.
