= Abiz =

Abiz may refer to:

- Abiz-e Jadid, city in Iran
- Tall-e Abiz, village in Iran
- Abıź, Bashkir name of Abyzovo, Republic of Bashkortostan, Russia
