= Bakur, Iran =

Bakur بكور
- Village
- Location within Iran
- Coordinates: 29°29′49″N 51°33′46″E
- Country: Iran
- Province: Fars
- County: Kazerun
- Bakhsh: Kamaraj and Konartakhteh
- Rural District: Kamaraj

Population (2006)
  - Total: 113
- Time zone: UTC+3:30 (IRST)
  - Summer (DST): UTC+4:30 (IRDT)

Bakur (Persian: بكور, also Romanized as Bakūr; also known as Bakr) is a village in Kamaraj Rural District, Kamaraj and Konartakhteh District, Kazerun County, Fars province, Iran. At the 2006 census, its population was 113, in 23 families.
