= Buraki-ye Sofla =

Buraki-ye Sofla بوركي سفلي
- Village
- Location within Iran
- Coordinates: 29°31′17″N 51°21′46″E
- Country: Iran
- Province: Fars
- County: Kazerun
- Bakhsh: Khesht
- Rural District: Khesht

Population (2006)
  - Total: 269
- Time zone: UTC+3:30 (IRST)
  - Summer (DST): UTC+4:30 (IRDT)

Buraki-ye Sofla (Persian: بوركي سفلي, also Romanized as Būrakī-ye Soflá and Būrakī-e Soflá; also known as Būraki, Būrakī Pā’īn, and Būrakī-ye Pā’īn) is a village in Khesht Rural District, Khesht District, Kazerun County, Fars province, Iran. At the 2006 census, its population was 269, in 46 families.
