= Kan Rud, Fars =

Kan Rud كانرود
- Village
- Location within Iran
- Coordinates: 29°16′06″N 52°02′00″E
- Country: Iran
- Province: Fars
- County: Kazerun
- Bakhsh: Jereh and Baladeh
- Rural District: Jereh

Population (2006)
  - Total: 253
- Time zone: UTC+3:30 (IRST)
  - Summer (DST): UTC+4:30 (IRDT)

Kan Rud (Persian: كانرود, also Romanized as Kān Rūd and Kānrūd) is a village in Jereh Rural District, Jereh and Baladeh District, Kazerun County, Fars province, Iran. At the 2006 census, its population was 253, in 53 families.
