= Tall-e Abiz =

Tall-e Abiz تل ابيض
- Village
- Location within Iran
- Coordinates: 29°16′16″N 51°55′30″E
- Country: Iran
- Province: Fars
- County: Kazerun
- Bakhsh: Jereh and Baladeh
- Rural District: Jereh

Population (2006)
  - Total: 801
- Time zone: UTC+3:30 (IRST)
  - Summer (DST): UTC+4:30 (IRDT)

Tall-e Abiz (Persian: تل ابيض, also Romanized as Tall-e Ābīẕ; also known as Tall-e Bīz and Tol Bīz) is a village in Jereh Rural District, Jereh and Baladeh District, Kazerun County, Fars province, Iran. At the 2006 census, its population was 801, in 193 families.
