= Arab-e Gavmishi =

Village in Fars province, Iran

Arab-e Gavmishi Persian: عرب گاوميشي
- Village
- Location within Iran
- Coordinates: 29°29′14″N 51°53′29″E
- Country: Iran
- Province: Fars
- County: Kazerun
- District: Jereh and Baladeh
- Rural District: Famur

Population (2016)
  - Total: 1,137
- Time zone: UTC+3:30 (IRST)

Arab-e Gavmishi (Persian: عرب گاوميشي) (Note: Also romanized as ‘Arab Gāvmīshī and ‘Arab-e Gāvmīshī; also known as Arab-e Gaymīshī) is a village in Famur Rural District of Jereh and Baladeh District, Kazerun County, Fars province, Iran.

== Demographics ==
=== Population ===
At the time of the 2006 National Census, the village's population was 1,292 in 293 households. The following census in 2011 counted 1,327 people in 353 households. The 2016 census measured the population of the village as 1,137 people in 317 households. It was the most populous village in its rural district.
