= Sar Mala, Fars =

Sar Mala سرملا
- Village
- Location within Iran
- Coordinates: 29°38′32″N 51°19′14″E
- Country: Iran
- Province: Fars
- County: Kazerun
- Bakhsh: Khesht
- Rural District: Khesht

Population (2006)
  - Total: 62
- Time zone: UTC+3:30 (IRST)
  - Summer (DST): UTC+4:30 (IRDT)

Sar Mala (Persian: سرملا, also Romanized as Sar Malā; also known as Sarmolleh) is a village in Khesht Rural District, Khesht District, Kazerun County, Fars province, Iran. At the 2006 census, its population was 62, in 15 families.
