= Jafar Jen =

Village in Fars province, Iran

Jafar Jen Persian: جعفرجن
- Village
- Location within Iran
- Coordinates: 29°33′50″N 51°24′45″E
- Country: Iran
- Province: Fars
- County: Kazerun
- District: Konartakhteh and Kamaraj
- Rural District: Konartakhteh

Population (2016)
  - Total: 294
- Time zone: UTC+3:30 (IRST)

Jafar Jen (Persian: جعفرجن) (Note: Also romanized as Ja‘far Jen; also known as Ja‘far Jin and Ja‘farebn) is a village in Konartakhteh Rural District (Note: Formerly Khesht Rural District) of Konartakhteh and Kamaraj District, (Note: Formerly Khesht and Kamaraj District) Kazerun County, Fars province, Iran.

== Demographics ==
=== Population ===
At the time of the 2006 National Census, the village's population was 528 in 140 households. The following census in 2011 counted 396 people in 126 households. The 2016 census measured the population of the village as 294 people in 101 households. It was the most populous village in its rural district.
