= Kateh-ye Khafr =

Kateh-ye Khafr (Persian: كته خفر), also known as Kat-e Khafr, may refer to:

- Kateh-ye Khafr-e Olya
- Kateh-ye Khafr-e Sofla
