= Jereh, Iran =

Village in Fars province, Iran

Jereh Persian: جره
- Village
- Location within Iran
- Coordinates: 29°14′36″N 51°58′42″E
- Country: Iran
- Province: Fars
- County: Kazerun
- District: Jereh and Baladeh
- Rural District: Jereh

Population (2016)
  - Total: 1,589
- Time zone: UTC+3:30 (IRST)

Jereh (Persian: جره) (Note: Also known as Gereh and Jireh) is a village in, and the capital of, Jereh Rural District of Jereh and Baladeh District, Kazerun County, Fars province, Iran. The previous capital of the rural district was the village of Baladeh, now the city of Valashahr.

== Demographics ==
=== Population ===
At the time of the 2006 National Census, the village's population was 1,491 in 337 households. The following census in 2011 counted 1,707 people in 391 households. The 2016 census measured the population of the village as 1,589 people in 457 households. It was the most populous village in its rural district.
