= Mehbudi =

Mehbudi (Persian: مهبودي) may refer to:

- Mehbudi-ye Olya
- Mehbudi-ye Sofla
