= Cherrun =

Cherrun چرون
- Village
- Location within Iran
- Coordinates: 29°35′11″N 51°25′55″E
- Country: Iran
- Province: Fars
- County: Kazerun
- Bakhsh: Khesht
- Rural District: Khesht

Population (2006)
  - Total: 64
- Time zone: UTC+3:30 (IRST)
  - Summer (DST): UTC+4:30 (IRDT)

Cherrun (Persian: چرون, also Romanized as Cherrūn and Cherūn; also known as Cherūm, Chorom, Churum, and Tchouran) is a village in Khesht Rural District, Khesht District, Kazerun County, Fars province, Iran. At the 2006 census, its population was 64, in 11 families.
