= Deh-e Pagah, Kazerun =

Deh-e Pagah ده پاگاه
- Village
- Location within Iran
- Coordinates: 29°30′12″N 51°51′23″E
- Country: Iran
- Province: Fars
- County: Kazerun
- Bakhsh: Jereh and Baladeh
- Rural District: Famur

Population (2006)
  - Total: 868
- Time zone: UTC+3:30 (IRST)
  - Summer (DST): UTC+4:30 (IRDT)

Deh-e Pagah (Persian: ده پاگاه, also Romanized as Deh-e Pāgāh) is a village in Famur Rural District, Jereh and Baladeh District, Kazerun County, Fars province, Iran. At the 2006 census, its population was 868, in 166 families.
