= Mehbudi-ye Olya =

Mehbudi-ye Olya مهبودي عليا
- Village
- Location within Iran
- Coordinates: 29°26′04″N 51°57′44″E
- Country: Iran
- Province: Fars
- County: Kazerun
- Bakhsh: Jereh and Baladeh
- Rural District: Famur

Population (2006)
  - Total: 49
- Time zone: UTC+3:30 (IRST)
  - Summer (DST): UTC+4:30 (IRDT)

Mehbudi-ye Olya (Persian: مهبودي عليا, also Romanized as Mehbūdī-ye 'Olyā; also known as Mehbūdī-ye Bālā) is a village in Famur Rural District, Jereh and Baladeh District, Kazerun County, Fars province, Iran. At the 2006 census, its population was 49, in 9 families.
