= Dadin-e Sofla =

Dadin-e Sofla دادين سفلي
- Village
- Location within Iran
- Coordinates: 29°22′56″N 51°47′50″E
- Country: Iran
- Province: Fars
- County: Kazerun
- Bakhsh: Jereh and Baladeh
- Rural District: Dadin

Population (2006)
  - Total: 466
- Time zone: UTC+3:30 (IRST)
  - Summer (DST): UTC+4:30 (IRDT)

Dadin-e Sofla (Persian: دادين سفلي, also Romanized as Dādīn-e Soflá; also known as Dādīn-e Pā’īn and Dīn ol Ḩadar) is a village in Dadin Rural District, Jereh and Baladeh District, Kazerun County, Fars province, Iran. At the 2006 census, its population was 466, in 95 families.
