= Nargeszar-e Famur =

Village in Fars province, Iran

Nargeszar-e Famur Persian: نرگس‌زار فامور
- Village
- Location within Iran
- Coordinates: 29°26′58″N 51°53′35″E
- Country: Iran
- Province: Fars
- County: Kazerun
- District: Jereh and Baladeh
- Rural District: Famur

Population (2016)
  - Total: 818
- Time zone: UTC+3:30 (IRST)

Nargeszar-e Famur (Persian: نرگس‌زار فامور) (Note: Also romanized as Nargeszār-e Fāmūr; also known as Nargeszār and Qal‘eh-ye Moshīrī) is a village in, and the capital of, Famur Rural District of Jereh and Baladeh District, Kazerun County, Fars province, Iran.

== Demographics ==
=== Population ===
At the time of the 2006 National Census, the village's population was 797 in 185 households. The following census in 2011 counted 712 people in 201 households. The 2016 census measured the population of the village as 818 people in 234 households.
