= Kamaraj, Iran =

Village in Fars province, Iran

Kamaraj Persian: كمارج
- Village
- Location within Iran
- Coordinates: 29°36′38″N 51°28′39″E
- Country: Iran
- Province: Fars
- County: Kazerun
- District: Konartakhteh and Kamaraj
- Rural District: Kamaraj

Population (2016)
  - Total: 944
- Time zone: UTC+3:30 (IRST)

Kamaraj (Persian: كمارج) (Note: Also romanized as Kamarej and Kamārej; also known as Kamarady, Kamarej, Kamārej, Kamārej-e Markazī) is a village in, and the capital of, Kamaraj Rural District of Konartakhteh and Kamaraj District, (Note: Formerly Khesht and Kamaraj District) Kazerun County, Fars province, Iran.

== History ==
On November 29th 1754, Azad Khan defeated Karim Khan Zand at the Battle of Kamarej.

== Demographics ==
=== Population ===
At the time of the 2006 National Census, the village's population was 1,389 in 292 households. The following census in 2011 counted 1,008 people in 264 households. The 2016 census measured the population of the village as 944 people in 272 households. It was the most populous village in its rural district.
