= Khvajeh Jamali, Kazerun =

Khvajeh Jamali خواجه جمالي
- Village
- Location within Iran
- Coordinates: 29°35′17″N 51°18′50″E
- Country: Iran
- Province: Fars
- County: Kazerun
- Bakhsh: Khesht
- Rural District: Khesht

Population (2006)
  - Total: 310
- Time zone: UTC+3:30 (IRST)
  - Summer (DST): UTC+4:30 (IRDT)

Khvajeh Jamali (Persian: خواجه جمالي, also Romanized as Khvājeh Jamālī) is a village in Khesht Rural District, Khesht District, Kazerun County, Fars province, Iran. At the 2006 census, its population was 310, in 73 families.
