= Emamzadeh Mohammad Rural District =

Rural district in Fars province, Iran

Emamzadeh Mohammad Rural District Persian: دهستان امامزاده محمد
- Rural District
- Location within Iran
- Coordinates: 29°39′19″N 51°21′34″E
- Country: Iran
- Province: Fars
- County: Kazerun
- District: Khesht
- Capital: Shahbaz Khani

Population (2016)
  - Total: 1,991
- Time zone: UTC+3:30 (IRST)

Emamzadeh Mohammad Rural District (Persian: دهستان امامزاده محمد) is in Khesht District of Kazerun County, Fars province, Iran. Its capital is the village of Shahbaz Khani.

== History ==
After the 2006 National Census, the city of Khesht and other parts were separated from Khesht and Kamaraj District (Note: Reamed Konartakhteh and Kamaraj District) in the formation of Khesht District. Emamzadeh Mohammad Rural District was created in the new district.

== Demographics ==
=== Population ===
At the time of the 2011 census, the rural district's population was 2,052 in 576 households. The 2016 census measured the population of the rural district as 1,991 in 599 households. The most populous of its 27 villages was Shahbaz Khani, with 801 people.
