= Sar Molla =

Sar Molla or Sar Mala (Persian: سرملا) may refer to:

- Sar Mala, Fars
- Sar Molla, Hormozgan
