= Dahleh, Fars =

Dahleh دهله
- Village
- Location within Iran
- Coordinates: 29°32′10″N 51°36′38″E
- Country: Iran
- Province: Fars
- County: Kazerun
- Bakhsh: Kamaraj and Konartakhteh
- Rural District: Kamaraj

Population (2006)
  - Total: 253
- Time zone: UTC+3:30 (IRST)
  - Summer (DST): UTC+4:30 (IRDT)

Dahleh (Persian: دهله, also Romanized as Dahlah and Dehleh; also known as Alīf, Dahli, and Dehlī) is a village in Kamaraj Rural District, Kamaraj and Konartakhteh District, Kazerun County, Fars province, Iran. At the 2006 census, its population was 253, in 55 families.
