= Kateh-ye Khafr-e Sofla =

Kateh-ye Khafr-e Sofla كته خفرسفلي
- Village
- Location within Iran
- Coordinates: 29°20′26″N 51°54′24″E
- Country: Iran
- Province: Fars
- County: Kazerun
- Bakhsh: Jereh and Baladeh
- Rural District: Jereh

Population (2006)
  - Total: 29
- Time zone: UTC+3:30 (IRST)
  - Summer (DST): UTC+4:30 (IRDT)

Kateh-ye Khafr-e Sofla (Persian: كته خفرسفلي, also Romanized as Kateh-ye Khafr-e Soflá; also known as Kat-e Khafr-e Soflá) is a village in Jereh Rural District, Jereh and Baladeh District, Kazerun County, Fars province, Iran. At the 2006 census, its population was 29, in 5 families.
