= Puskan Castle =

Castle in Fars province, Iran

Puskan castle
- قلعه پوسکان

General information
- Type: Castle
- Location: Kazerun County, Iran

Puskan castle (Persian: قلعه پوسکان) is a historical castle located in Kazerun County in Fars province, The longevity of this fortress dates back to the Sasanian Empire.
