= Dadin-e Olya =

Village in Fars province, Iran

Dadin-e Olya Persian: دادين عليا
- Village
- Location within Iran
- Coordinates: 29°19′06″N 51°51′51″E
- Country: Iran
- Province: Fars
- County: Kazerun
- District: Jereh and Baladeh
- Rural District: Dadin

Population (2016)
  - Total: 861
- Time zone: UTC+3:30 (IRST)

Dadin-e Olya (Persian: دادين عليا) (Note: Also romanized as Dādīn-e ‘Olyā; also known as Dādīn-e Bālā) is a village in, and the capital of, Dadin Rural District of Jereh and Baladeh District, Kazerun County, Fars province, Iran.

== Demographics ==
=== Population ===
At the time of the 2006 National Census, the village's population was 1,109 in 207 households. The following census in 2011 counted 1,003 people in 244 households. The 2016 census measured the population of the village as 861 people in 259 households.
