= Cherum =

Cherum may refer to:

- A plum-cherry hybrid
- Cherrun, Iran
