= Khvajeh Jamali =

Khvajeh Jamali (Persian: خواجه جمالي) may refer to:

- Khvajeh Jamali, Kazerun
- Khvajeh Jamali, Neyriz
