= Sar Mashhad =

Village in Fars province, Iran

Sar Mashhad Persian: سرمشهد
- Village
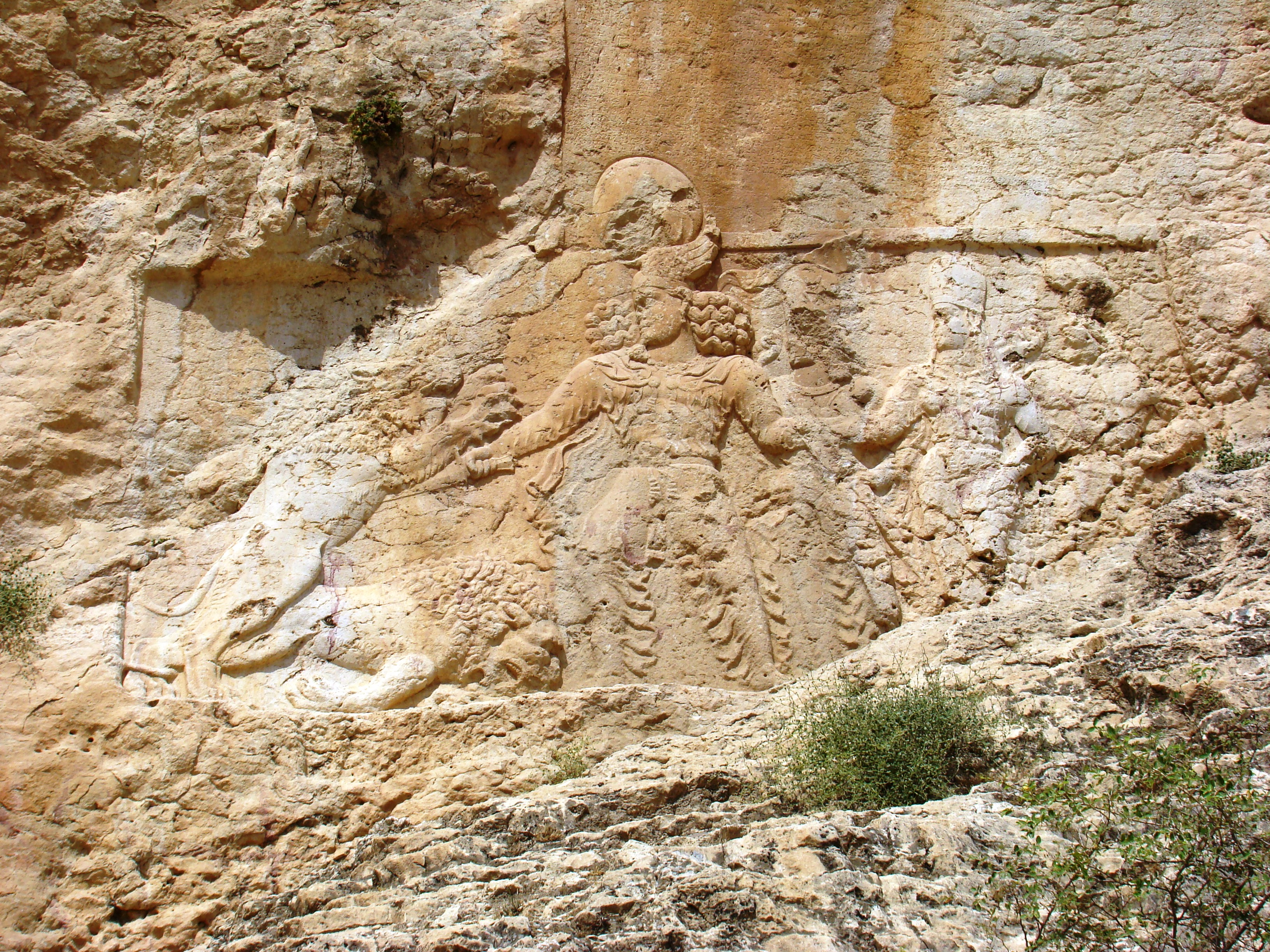
- Rock relief of Bahram II at Sar Mashhad

- Location within Iran
- Coordinates: 29°17′25″N 51°42′14″E
- Country: Iran
- Province: Fars
- County: Kazerun
- District: Jereh and Baladeh
- Rural District: Dadin

Population (2016)
  - Total: 2,818
- Time zone: UTC+3:30 (IRST)

Sar Mashhad (Persian: سرمشهد) (Note: Also known as Sar Meshad) is a village in Dadin Rural District of Jereh and Baladeh District, Kazerun County, Fars province, Iran.

== Demographics ==
=== Language and ethnicity ===
The inhabitants of Sar Mashhad are from the Qashqai tribe, Farsimdan tribe and speak Qashqai Turkish.

=== Population ===
At the time of the 2006 National Census, the village's population was 3,047 in 623 households. The following census in 2011 counted 2,878 people in 684 households. The 2016 census measured the population of the village as 2,818 people in 748 households. It was the most populous village in its rural district.

== Geography ==
=== Distance from important cities ===
- Kazerun 65 km
- Shiraz 169 km
- Ishahan 540 km
- Tehran 970 km

== Archaeology ==
The place is notable for being the site of a Sasanian rock relief made during the reign of king (shah) Bahram II (r. 274–293). The relief portrays him as a hunter who has slain a lion while throwing his sword at another. His wife is holding his right hand in a signal of safeguard, while the high priest Kartir and another figure, most likely a prince, are watching. Scholarship generally considers the rock relief to depict a hunting scene. Although multiple symbolic and allegorical explanations have been offered for the depiction. An inscription of Kartir is underneath the relief.

== See also ==
- Kazerun
- Qashqai people
- Bishapur

== Sources ==
- Shahbazi, Alireza Shapour (1988). "Bahrām II". In Yarshater, Ehsan (ed.). Encyclopædia Iranica (Online ed.). Encyclopædia Iranica Foundation. ISBN 978-0710091215.
- Shayegan, M. Rahim (2020). "The Cameo of Warahrān II and the Kušano-Sasanians". Bulletin of the Asia Institute. 30: 1–20.
