= Deh-e Pagah =

Deh-e Pagah or Dehpagah (Persian: ده پاگاه) may refer to:

- Deh-e Pagah, Kazerun
- Dehpagah, Sepidan
