= Battle of Kamarej =

1754 battle

Date	Late 1754
Location	Kamarej, near Kazerun, Iran
Result	Zand victory

Belligerents
Zand dynasty	Afshars

Commanders and leaders
Karim Khan Zand; Mirza Ali Beg Khurmuji; Raʾis Ahmad Shah Tangestani	Fath-Ali Khan Afshar

Strength
6,000–8,000; 4,000 musketeers	12,000

Casualties and losses
Unknown	Heavy

The Battle of Kamarej took place in late 1754 between the forces of Karim Khan Zand and Fath-Ali Khan Afshar during the power struggles in western Iran following the collapse of the Afsharid dynasty.

== Background ==
In 1754, Karim Khan Zand was attempting to rebuild his forces in the Garmsir after being denied entry to Shiraz. At the same time, Azad Khan Afghan marched on Shiraz and defeated local tribal forces near Persepolis, capturing the city with an army of around 12,000 men. Karim Khan then established his base in Kazerun, with support from the townsmen under Ali Qoli Khan Kazaruni and levies from Dashtestan. He also sought assistance from Nasir Khan of Lar, who cautiously maintained neutrality while commanding a sizeable force.

== Battle ==
On November 29th, Fath Ali’s forces advanced on Kazerun. Karim Khan’s smaller army, consisting of Zand troops, townsmen, and Dashtestan levies, was forced to evacuate the town and retreat westward to the village of Khesht near the Kamarej Pass. There, Karim was reinforced by around 4,000 musketeers under Mirza Ali Beg Khurmuji and Raʾis Ahmad Shah Tangestani. The villagers, led by Rostam Soltan, provided supplies and support. Meanwhile, Fath-Ali Khan Afshar, commanding the army, set out against the Zand forces in the narrow Kamarej Pass, where he was ambushed and defeated by the efforts of Karim and the Kheshti musketeers.

== Aftermath ==
Following the defeat, Faith Ali’s forces retreated from Kazerun and left Fars to face a Qajar incursion. Karim established himself in Shiraz shortly after sympathizers opened the gates to him, and the engagement heralded his later conquest of Iran.
