= Abyzov =

Abyzov (Russian: Абы́зов; masculine) or Abyzova (Абызова́; feminine) is a Russian surname. Variants of this surname include Abysov/Abysova (Абы́сов/Абы́сова), Obyzov/Obyzova (Обы́зов/Обы́зова), and Obysov/Obysova (Обы́сов/Обы́сова).

It derives from a patronymic which itself is derived from the nickname "Обыз" (Obyz) or its phonetic variations "Абыз" (Abyz), "Абыс" (Abys), and "Обыс" (Obys). In the 15th–17th centuries, the primary meaning of the word "обыз" (obyz) or "обыс" (obys) was a Muslim cleric, a mullah, but it is more likely that the nicknames were derived from the figurative meanings of the word in some dialects: an impious person, a wrong-doer, a miscreant, an insolent person, one who disobeys.

The surname is shared by the following people:

- Dmitry Abyzov (born 1992), Russian association football player
- Mikhail Abyzov (born 1972), Russian politician

== See also ==
- Abyzovo, several rural localities in Russia
