= Kanrud =

Kanrud or Kan Rud (Persian: كانرود) may refer to:

- Kan Rud, Fars
- Kanrud, Gilan
