= Dahleh =

Dahleh or Dahlah or Dehleh (Persian: دهله), also rendered as Daleh, may refer to:

- Dahleh, Fars
- Dahleh, Lorestan
