= Buraki Rural District =

Rural district in Fars province, Iran

Boorekey Rural District Persian: دهستان بورکی
- Rural District
- Location within Iran
- Coordinates: 29°32′16″N 51°19′49″E
- Country: Iran
- Province: Fars
- County: Kazeroun
- District: Khesht
- Capital: Boorekey-ye Olya

Population (2016)
  - Total: 3,685
- Time zone: UTC+3:30 (IRST)

Boorekey Rural District (Persian: دهستان بورکی) is in Khesht District of Kazeroun County, Fars province, Iran. Its capital is the village of Buraki-ye Olya.

== History ==
After the 2006 National Census, the city of Khesht and other parts were separated from Khesht and Kamaraj District (Note: Now Konartakhteh and Kamaraj District) in the establishment of Khesht District. Boorekey Rural District was created in the new district.

== Demographics ==
=== Population ===
At the time of the 2011 census, the rural district's population was 3,368 in 942 households. The 2016 census measured the population of the rural district as 3,685 in 1,124 households. The most populous of its 21 villages was Boorekey-ye Olya, with 2,414 people.
