= Bakur =

Bakur may refer to:

== Places ==
- Bakur, Iran, village in Kamaraj Rural District, Kamaraj and Konartakhteh District, Kazerun
- Chumar Bakur, gemstone mining area
- Turkish Kurdistan

== People with the given name ==
- Bakur Gogitidze (born 1973), Georgian wrestler
- Bakur Kvezereli (born 1981), Georgian-American entrepreneur
- Pacorus of Armenia, 2nd-century king

== People with the surname ==
- Abdulgadir Ilyas Bakur (born 1990), Nigerian-born Qatari football player
- Nerses Bakur, Caucasian Albanian Church in the late 7th and early 8th century
