= Kartir's inscription at Naqsh-e Rajab =

Sasanian inscription in Iran

Coordinates: 29.9880°N 52.8710°E

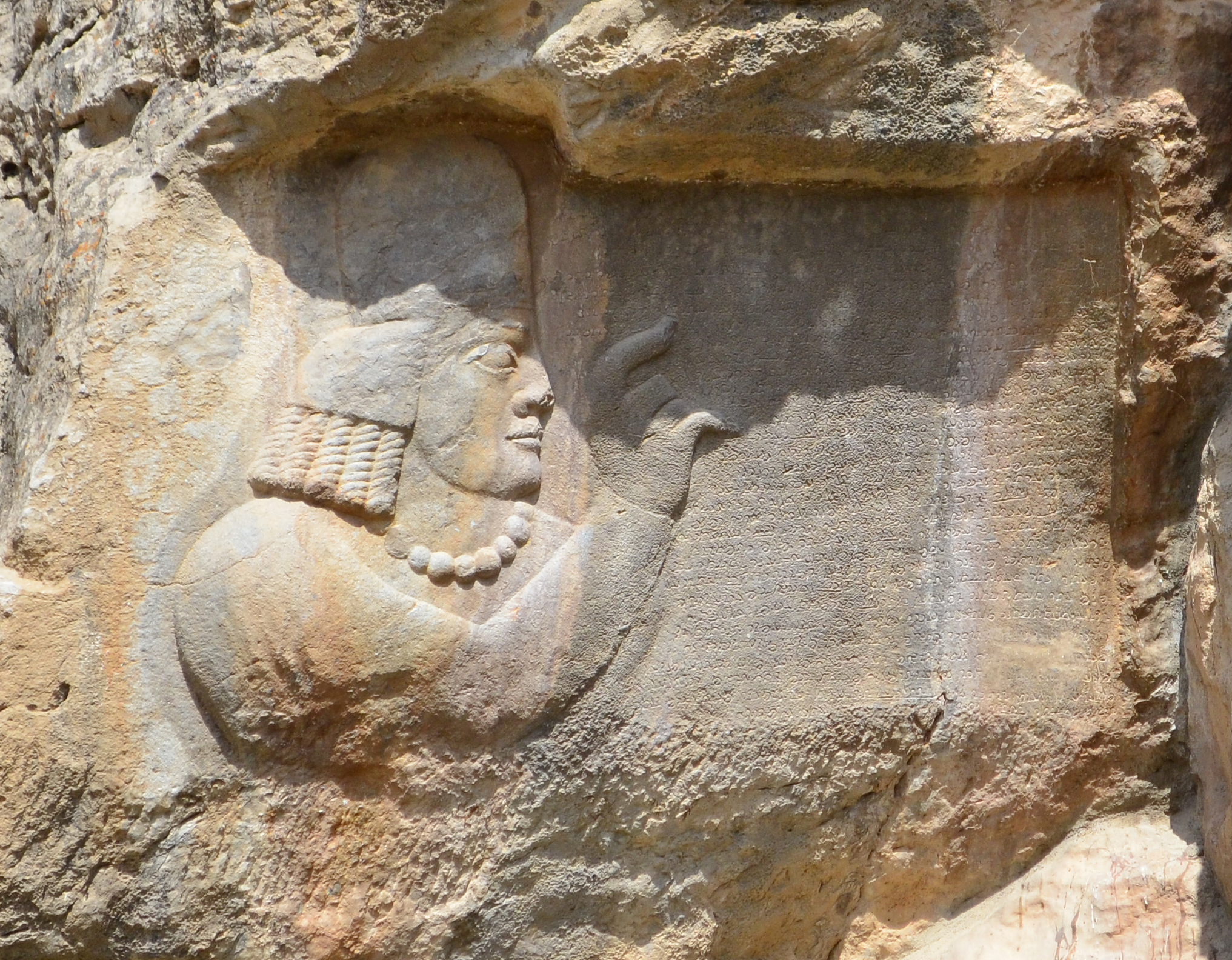
Kartir's inscription at Naqsh-e Rajab

Kartir, an influential Sasanian priest of the late 3rd century, left an inscription in Naqsh-e Rajab in the Chamgan mountain. The inscription is located about one kilometer south of the ancient city of Istakhr, and about three kilometers north of Persepolis. In Naqsh-e Rajab, there are also some figures of Ardashir I and Shapur I. Kartir's inscription is incised next to a relief of Ahura Mazda appointing Ardashir I as the Shahanshah of Ērānshahr. Kartir was the only non-royal person in Sasanian Iran who was granted the right to have an inscription.

Kartir's inscription contains 31 lines in Middle Persian and on the left side of it, a portrait of Kartir himself is incised. The text introduces Kartir and briefly describes his ascent (Kardegān). Kartir also has two other inscriptions in Naqsh-e Rostam and Sar Mashhad that describe his ascent in more detail. He wants the reader to follow the path of Ahura Mazda like him and briefly lists his deeds, like building fire temples and devoting property to other Mobads. He then lists his titles in the Sasanian court: "mobad and herbad" in the time of Shapur I, "Kartir, the mobad of Hormozd" in the time of Hormozd I and Bahram I, and "Mobad Kartir whose soul Bahram and Hormozd saved" at the time of Bahram II. This part is described in more detail in 3 other inscriptions he has left behind. At the end, he mentions a certain "Bōkhtag" as his "dabir" (scribe).

== Sources ==
- Skjærvø, Prods Oktor (2011). "Kartir". Encyclopaedia Iranica, Vol. XV, Fasc. 6. pp. 608–628.
