= Naqsh-e Rajab =

Archaeological site in Fars province, Iran

Coordinates: 29.966486°N 52.887043°E

- نقش رجب (Persian) (Persian)
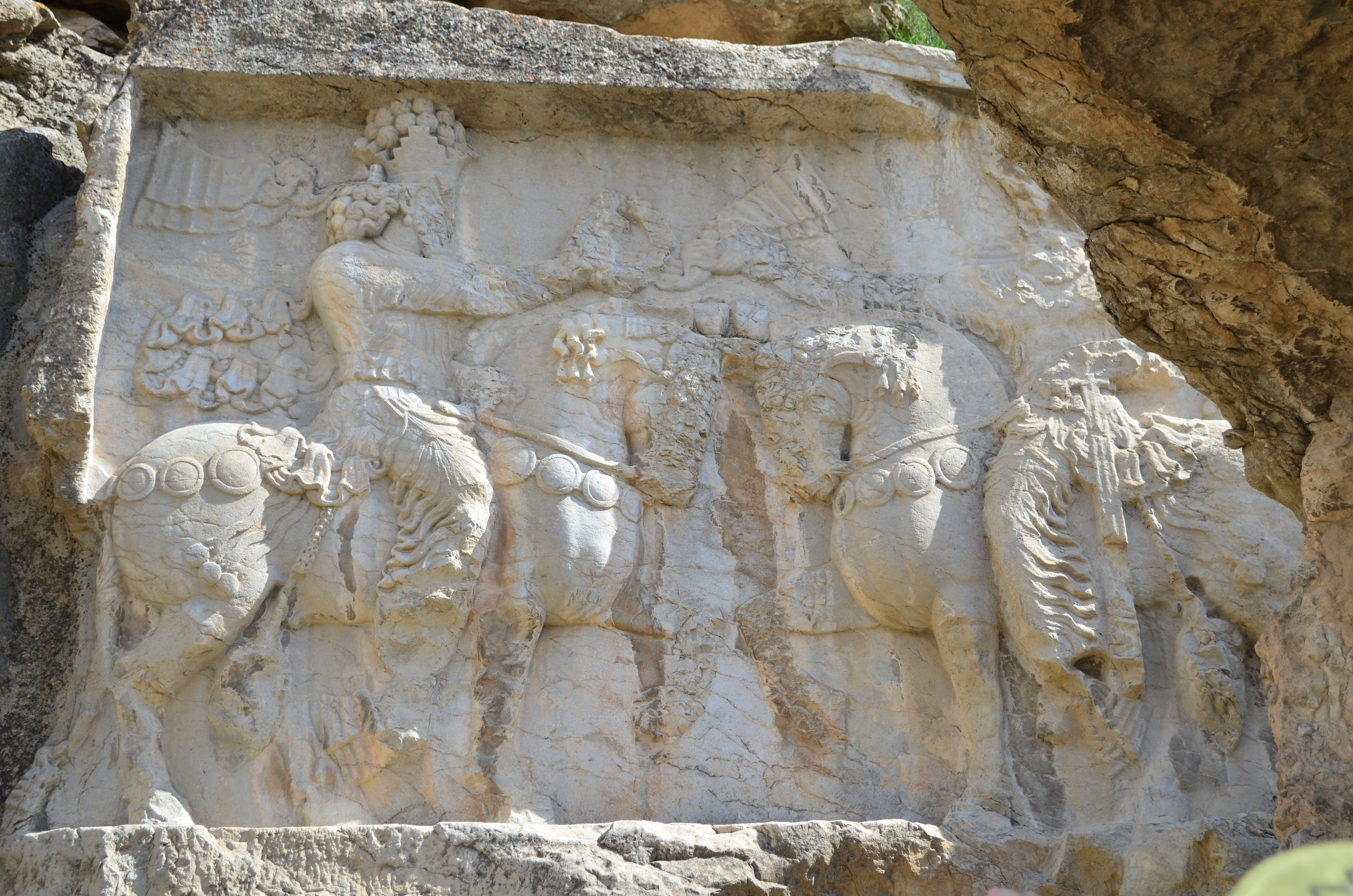
- Investiture of Shapur I by Ahura Mazda
- Interactive map of Naqsh-e Rajab
- Periods: Sasanian
- Cultures: Persian
- Location: Marvdasht, Fars province, Iran

Site notes
- Management: Cultural Heritage, Handicrafts and Tourism Organization of Iran

Iran National Heritage List
- Official name: Naqsh-e Rostam
- Type: Rock tomb necropolis and bas-reliefs
- Designated: 1931
- Reference no.: 21
- Conservation organization: Cultural Heritage, Handicrafts and Tourism Organization of Iran

Naqsh-e Rajab (Persian: نقش رجب, Persian pronunciation: [næɣʃeɾæˈdʒæb]) is an archaeological site west of Istakhr and about 5 km north of Persepolis in Fars province, Iran. Naqsh-e Rajab is the site of four limestone rockface inscriptions and rock-cut bas-reliefs that date to the early Sasanian Empire.

Together with Naqsh-e Rostam, which lies 2.5 kilometres (1.6 mi) away, the site is part of the Marvdasht cultural complex which itself is a tentative candidate for World Heritage Site status.

== Reliefs ==
The site of Naqsh-e Rajab features four Sasanian reliefs, all dating to the first century of Sasanian rule.

=== Investiture of Ardashir I ===
The earliest is the investiture scene of Ardashir I, the first Sasanian King of Kings. The figure of Ardashir is depicted standing to the left, wearing his unique crown, including a korymbos, which is reflected on his coinage. Ardashir receives the diadem from Ahura Mazda, crowned in an Achaemenid style tiara, and is surrounded by figures, including what may be his infant grandsons, and others whose identity is disputed.

=== Investiture of Shapur I ===
The next relief, in terms of date, is the investiture scene of Shapur, where the king is depicted on horseback receiving a diadem or "ring of power" from Ahura Mazda. The relief resembles several similar investiture reliefs made by Shapur, most notably the investiture scene at Tang-e Chowgan near Bishapur.

=== Equestrian Relief of Shapur I ===
The second relief commissioned by Shapur I is situated directly opposite the first. It depicts Shapur I on horseback accompanied by 9 individuals on foot. The 9 courtiers are not identifiable with any certainty. A short tri-lingual inscription in Parthian, Greek, and Middle Persian identifies the central figure as Shapur I.

=== Bust of Kerdir ===
The latest relief is a bust of the Zoroastrian high priest Kerdir. The relief is dated to the reign of Bahram II, and includes a 31-line inscription in Middle Persian outlining Kerdir's career under the Sasanian monarchs Shapur I, Hormizd I, Bahram I and Bahram II. The inscription also includes a polemical account by Kerdir of a supposed journey to the Zoroastrian otherworld, which the inscription states was intended to strengthen confidence in the veracity of the Zoroastrian faith.

== Gallery ==
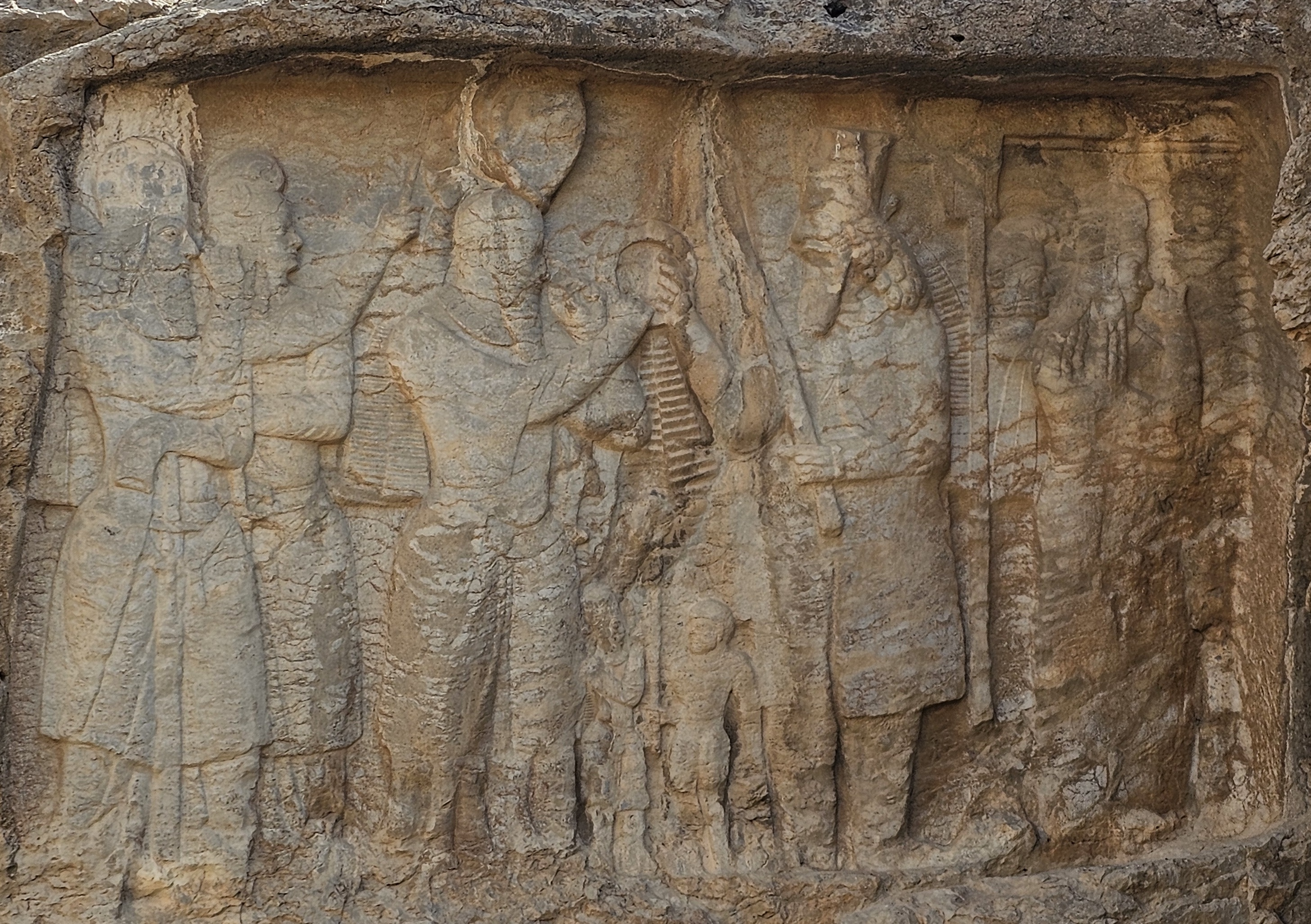
3rd century CE relief of the investiture of Ardashir I (center left) receiving the ring of power and the diadem from the god Ahura Mazda (center right). Between them are Ardashir's grandson Hormizd I and a deity (probably Mithra). On the left, Ardashir's son, Shapur I. On the right, two women.

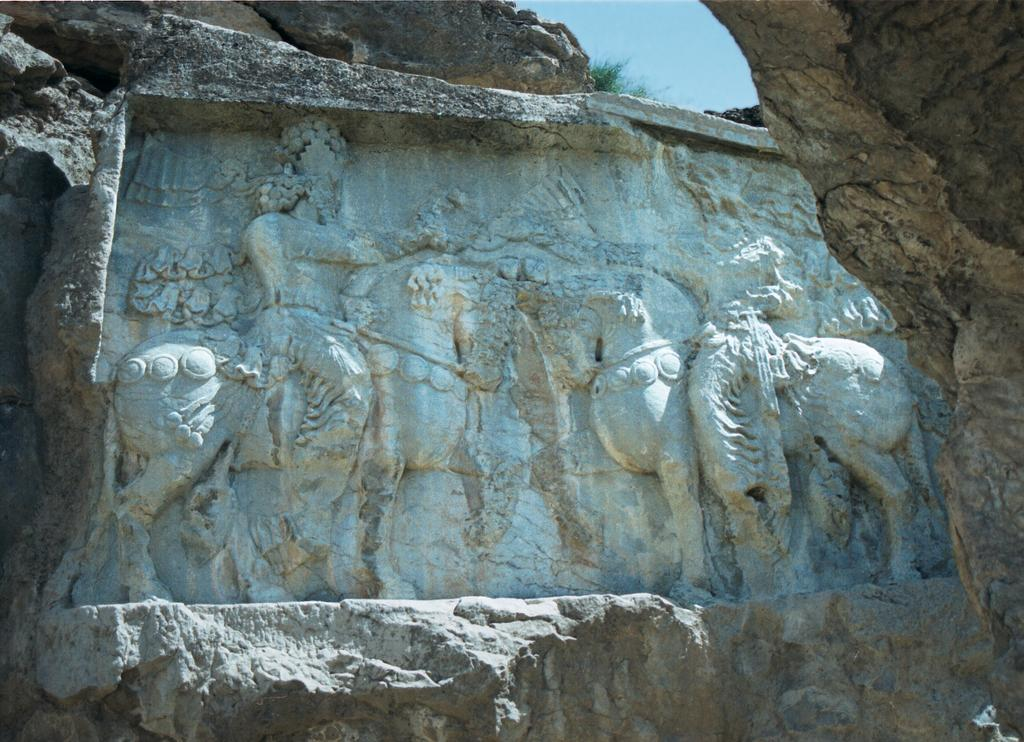
3rd century CE relief of the investiture of Shapur I (right) receiving the ring of power and the diadem from the god Ahura Mazda (left).

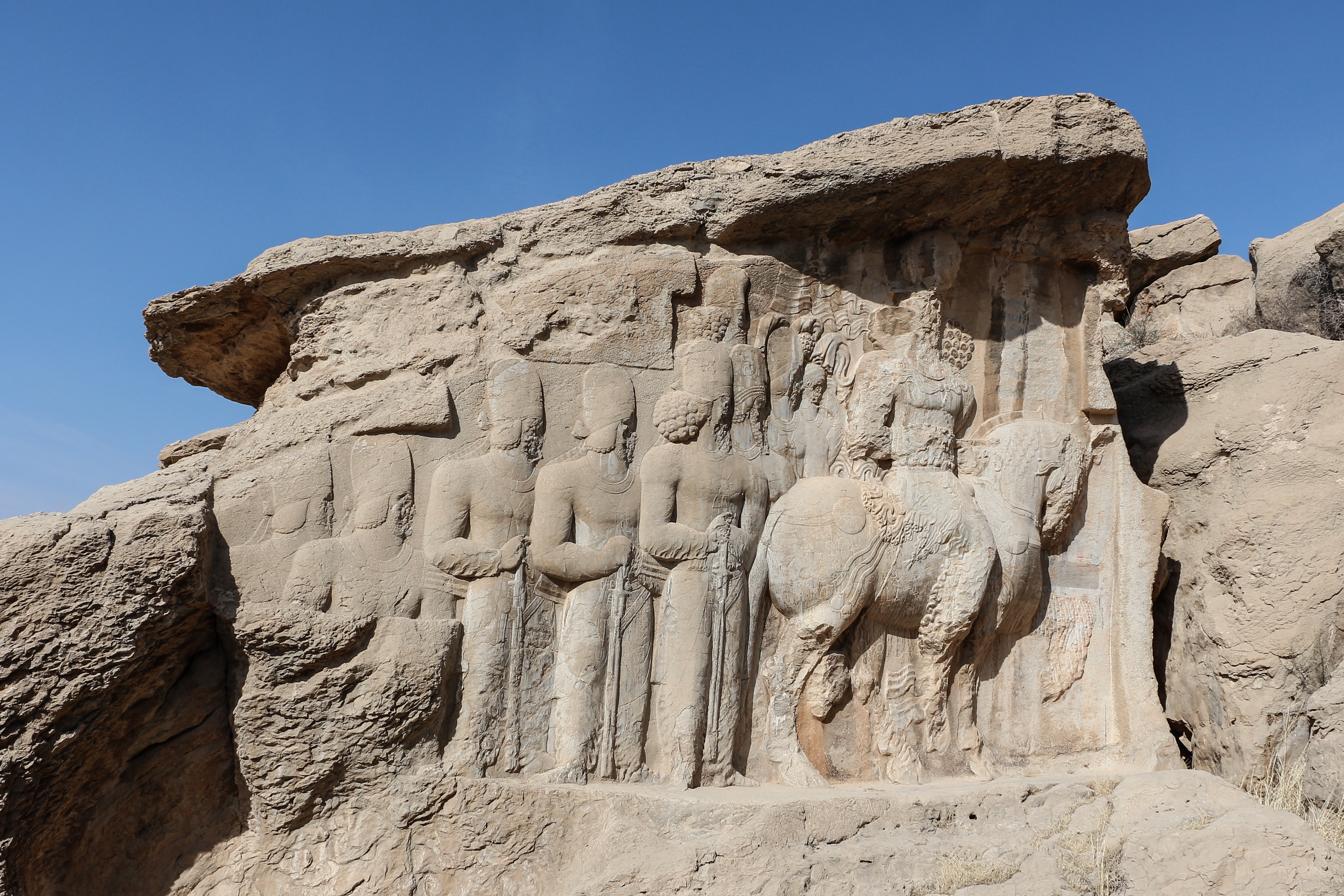
"Shapur's Parade" at Naqsh-e Rajab

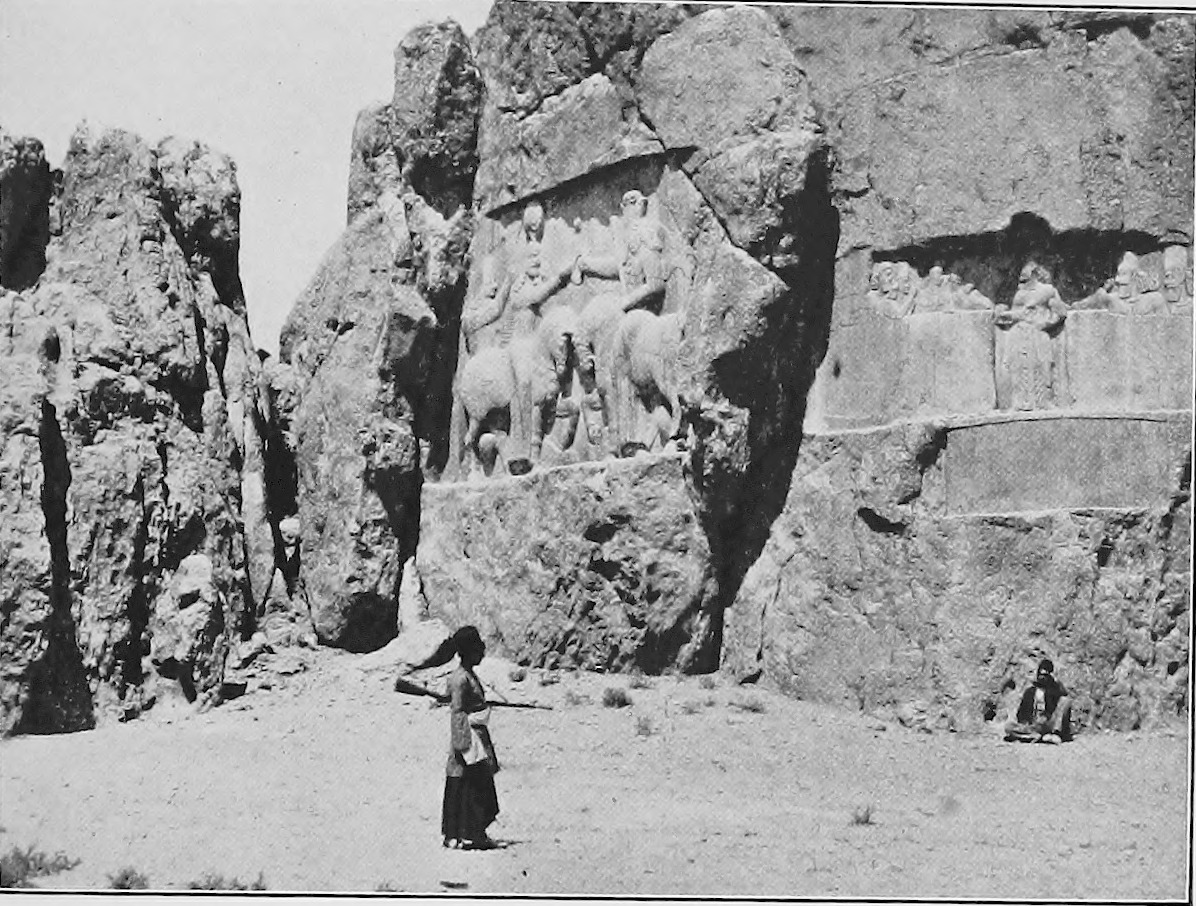
Photograh of Naqsh-e Rajab, turn of the century

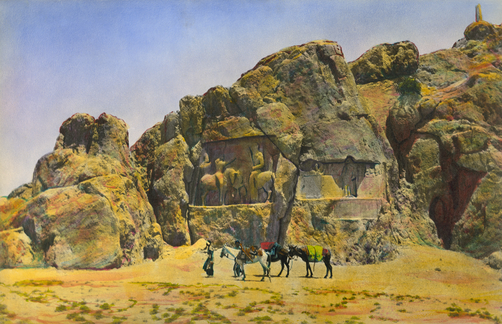
Photograph of Naqsh-e Rajab, 1921

== See also ==
- Kartir's inscription at Naqsh-e Rajab
- List of colossal sculpture in situ
- Naqsh-e Rustam
- Taq-e Bostan, another site of Sassanid-era rock reliefs.
