= Abyzovo =

Abyzovo (Russian: Абызово) is the name of several rural localities in Russia:

- Abyzovo, Republic of Bashkortostan, a selo in Karaidelsky Selsoviet of Karaidelsky District in the Republic of Bashkortostan
- Abyzovo, Chuvash Republic, a selo in Apnerskoye Rural Settlement of Vurnarsky District in the Chuvash Republic
