= Abysov =

Abysov (Russian: Абы́сов; masculine) or Abysova (Абы́сова; feminine) is a Russian last name, a variant of Abyzov. The following people bear this last name:

- Irina Abysova (b. 1980), Russian open water swimmer and triathlete
