= Valashahr =

City in Fars province, Iran

Valashahr Persian: والاشهر
- City
- Location within Iran
- Coordinates: 29°17′07″N 51°56′22″E
- Country: Iran
- Province: Fars
- County: Kazerun
- District: Jereh and Baladeh

Population (2016)
  - Total: 5,972
- Time zone: UTC+3:30 (IRST)

Valashahr (Persian: والاشهر) (Note: Also romanized as Vālāshāhr; formerly Baladeh (بالاده)) is a city in, and the capital of, Jereh and Baladeh District of Kazerun County, Fars province, Iran. As a village, it was the capital of Jereh Rural District until its capital was transferred to the village of Jereh.

== Demographics ==
=== Population ===
At the time of the 2006 National Census, the city's population was 3,936 in 856 households. The following census in 2011 counted 4,243 people in 1,131 households. The 2016 census measured the population of the city as 5,972 people in 1,689 households.

In 2017, the name of the city was changed from Baladeh to Valashahr.
