= Bahram II's rock relief at Sar Mashhad =

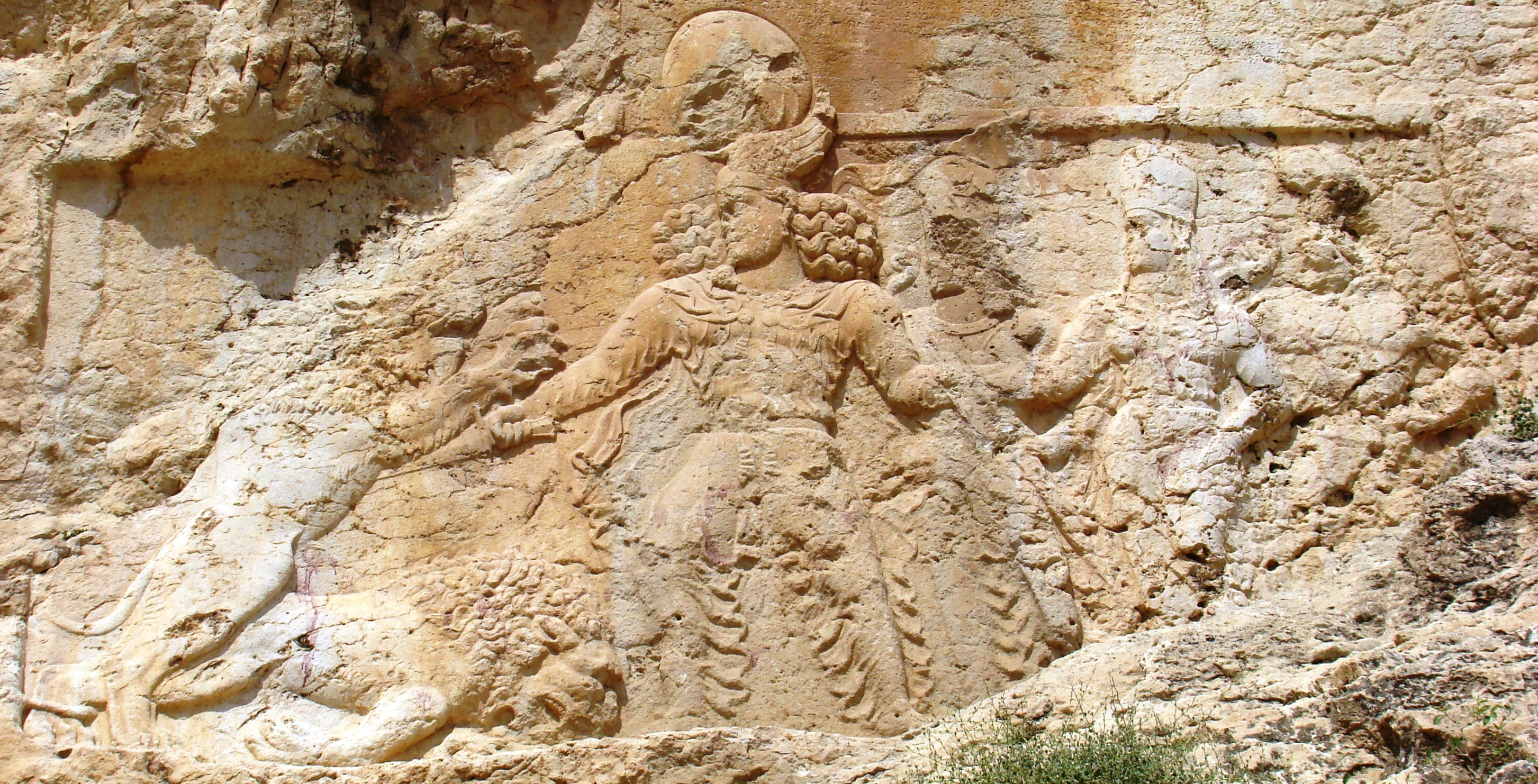
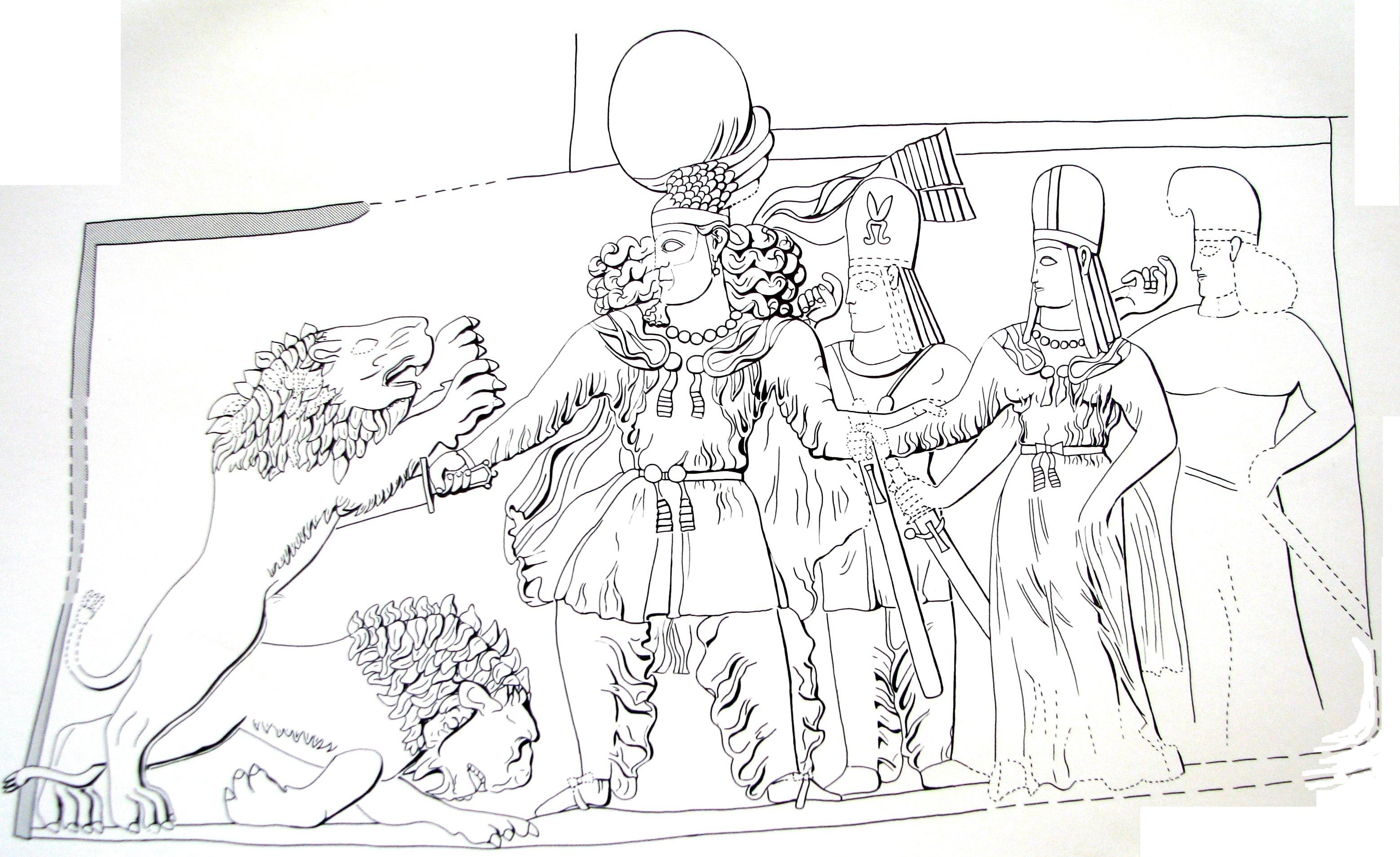
- Rock relief of Bahram II at Sar Mashhad. The king is fighting two lions and holding the arm of a female figure, possibly his wife Shapurdukhtak. The individual with a symbol on his hat is the Zoroastrian priest Kartir, while the identity of the final figure remains uncertain A sketch of the rock relief, showing a more clear depiction
- Year: 274–293
- Condition: Damaged
- Location: Sar Mashhad, Fars province, Iran 29°17′25″N 51°42′14″E

Bahram II's rock relief at Sar Mashhad depicts the Sasanian king Bahram II (r. 274–293) fighting two lions, with one already killed. He is holding the arm of a female figure, possibly his wife Shapurdukhtak. The individual with a symbol on his hat is the Zoroastrian priest Kartir, while the identity of the final figure is uncertain. (Note: According to the Iranologist Alireza Shapour Shahbazi, it is "probably a prince".)

Scholarship generally considers the rock relief to depict a hunting scene. Although multiple symbolic and allegorical explanations have been offered for the depiction.

== Symbolism of the two lions ==
=== In relation to the Kushano-Sasanian kingdom ===
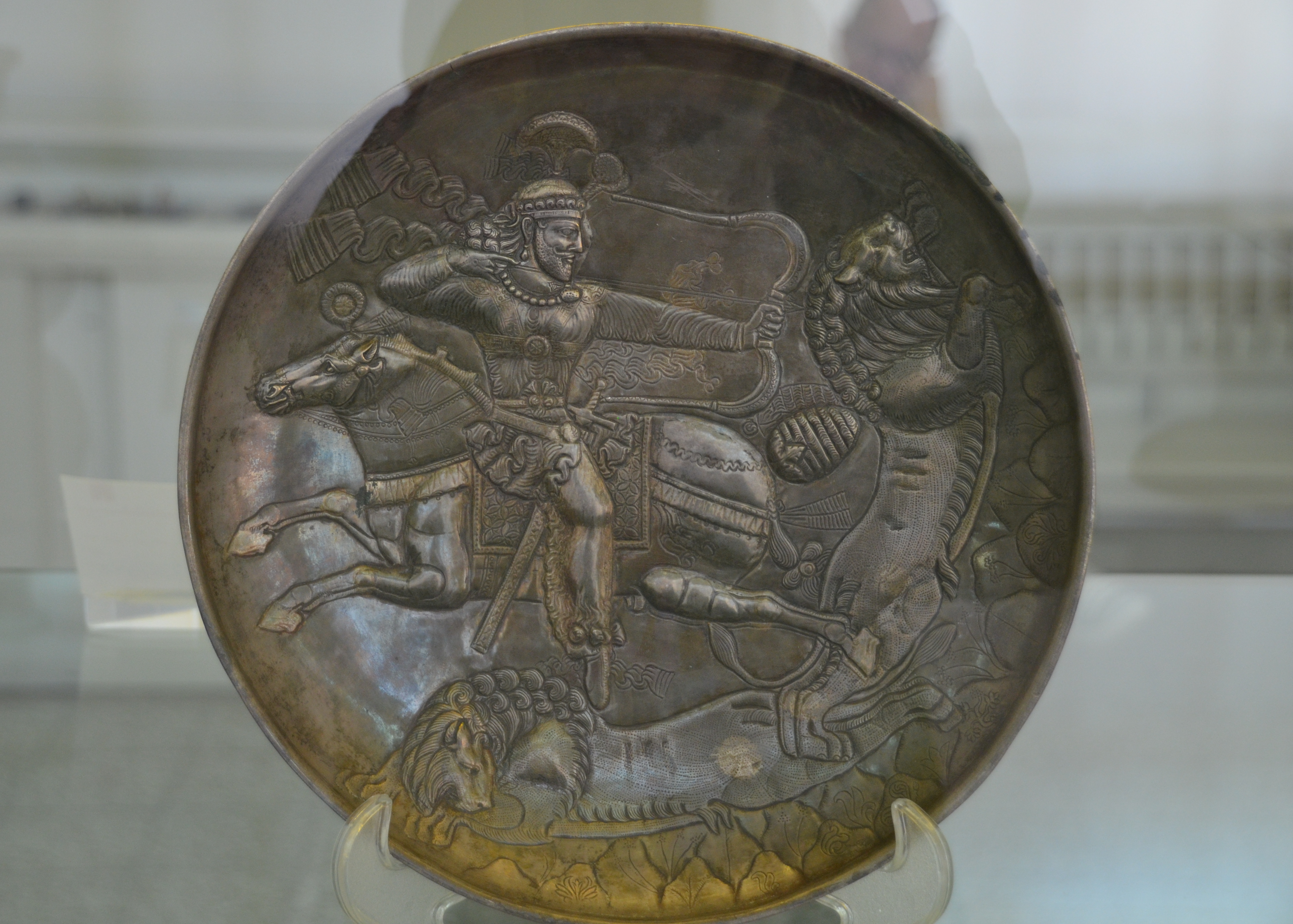
The Sari silver plate, seemingly created in the Kushano-Sasanian Kingdom, and depicting a king (possibly Hormizd I Kushanshah) hunting two lions. This type of earlier Sasanian plate depicting a two-lion hunt scene may have served as the inspiration for Bahram II's rock relief at Sar Mashhad.

The rock relief provides the earliest confirmed instance in Sasanian dynastic art of two lions being hunted by a king. The theme is recorded far more frequently on silver-gilt plates from later eras, such as the British Museum plate of Bahram V (r. 420–438) from the 6th or 7th century. Third-century provincial art is the probable source for the two-lion hunt scenes found on Sasanian silver plates, predating the adoption of this style by the central court. These early depictions were likely made to demonstrate the combat skills of princes and local rulers on the frontier. When the portrayed subject was a royal prince serving as a provincial sub-king, it was to demonstrate their qualifications as future heirs to the throne.

It was only from the start of the 4th century that the Sasanian government started dominating in the production and distribution of portrayals of hunting scenes. Two earlier silver-gilt plates depicting the hunting of two felines, seemingly created under the Kushano-Sasanian Kingdom, may have served as templates for Bahram II's rock relief at Sar Mashhad.

Bahram II's reign likely coincided with the production of these provincial Kushano-Sasanian silver-gilt plates. They were probably created during the reign of Hormizd I Kushanshah (r. 275–300), due to their grandiose depiction. Hormizd I Kushanshah's adoption of the imperial title shahanshah (King of Kings), the use of the term mazdesn bay ("His Mazdean Majesty") on his coins, and his portrayal in equestrian feline hunts on silver-gilt plates could be viewed as signs of his attempt to contest the authority of Bahram II.

The Sar-e Mashhad rock carving seemingly took inspiration from early Kushano-Sasanian silver plate designs while simultaneously acting as a direct counter to them. This allowed Bahram II to take back royal privileges that had been challenged by the imagery of Hormizd I Kushanshah. By depicting himself fighting two lions (as well as having himself depicted on cameos with a Nandi Bull), Bahram II appropriated symbols used by the Kushanshah to demonstrate his own supreme rule.

=== In Zoroastrianism ===
In Iran and the rest of the Ancient Near East, felines typically symbolized royal power. However, they are portrayed negatively in Zoroastrianism. In their depictions as targets during Sasanian royal hunts, they may have been viewed as evil creatures created by Ahriman, the main force of evil in Zoroastrianism. In the Zoroastrian text Bundahishn, Ahriman created felines as a type of xrafstar ("noxious creatures").

The depiction at Sar-e Mashhad of Bahram II in combat with two lions likely also served to symbolically portray Bahram II as the champion of the weh dēn ("good religion") standing against the creations of evil. From a less allegorical perspective, the scene could refer to the actual enemies of the Sasanian empire, the Roman emperor Carus (r. 282–283) and Hormizd I Kushanshah.

== Sources ==
- Shahbazi, Alireza Shapour (1988). "Bahrām II". In Yarshater, Ehsan (ed.). Encyclopædia Iranica (Online ed.). Encyclopædia Iranica Foundation. ISBN 978-0710091215.
- Shayegan, M. Rahim (2020). "The Cameo of Warahrān II and the Kušano-Sasanians". Bulletin of the Asia Institute. 30: 1–20.
