= Konartakhteh =

City in Fars province, Iran

Konartakhteh Persian: كنارتخته
- City
- Location within Iran
- Coordinates: 29°32′03″N 51°23′49″E
- Country: Iran
- Province: Fars
- County: Kazerun
- District: Konartakhteh and Kamaraj

Population (2016)
  - Total: 6,081
- Time zone: UTC+3:30 (IRST)

Konartakhteh (Persian: كنارتخته) (Note: Also romanized as Konār Takhteh and Konārtakhteh; also known as Kunār Takhteh) is a city in, and the capital of, Konartakhteh and Kamaraj District (Note: Formerly Khesht and Kamaraj District) of Kazerun County, Fars province, Iran. It also serves as the administrative center for Konartakhteh Rural District. (Note: Formerly Khesht Rural District) The rural district was previously administered from the city of Khesht.

== Demographics ==
=== Population ===
At the time of the 2006 National Census, the city's population was 6,690 in 1,477 households. The following census in 2011 counted 5,478 people in 1,562 households. The 2016 census measured the population of the city as 6,081 people in 1,764 households.
