= Tol-e Noqareh, Mahvarmilani =

Tol-e Noqareh تل نقاره
- Village
- Location within Iran
- Coordinates: 29°54′28″N 51°03′11″E
- Country: Iran
- Province: Fars
- County: Mamasani
- Bakhsh: Mahvarmilani
- Rural District: Mishan

Population (2006)
  - Total: 71
- Time zone: UTC+3:30 (IRST)
  - Summer (DST): UTC+4:30 (IRDT)

Tol-e Noqareh (Persian: تل نقاره, also Romanized as Tol-e Noqāreh) is a village in Mishan Rural District, Mahvarmilani District, Mamasani County, Fars province, Iran. At the 2006 census, its population was 71, in 15 families.
