= Tall Naqareh, Mamasani =

Tall Naqareh تل نقاره
- Village
- Location within Iran
- Coordinates: 30°04′40″N 51°35′49″E
- Country: Iran
- Province: Fars
- County: Mamasani
- Bakhsh: Central
- Rural District: Bakesh-e Yek

Population (2006)
  - Total: 32
- Time zone: UTC+3:30 (IRST)
  - Summer (DST): UTC+4:30 (IRDT)

Tall Naqareh (Persian: تل نقاره, also Romanized as Tall Naqāreh) is a village in Bakesh-e Yek Rural District, in the Central District of Mamasani County, Fars province, Iran. At the 2006 census, its population was 32, in 6 families.
