= Abyzovo, Republic of Bashkortostan =

Abyzovo Абызово Абыҙ
- Village
- Location within Bashkortostan Location within Russia
- Coordinates: 55°49′N 56°56′E
- Country: Russia
- Region: Bashkortostan
- District: Karaidelsky District
- Time zone: UTC+5:00

Abyzovo (Russian: Абызово, Bashkir: Абыҙ, Abıź) is a rural locality (a selo) in Karaidelsky Selsoviet of Karaidelsky District, Bashkortostan, Russia. The population was 905 as of 2010. There are 34 streets.

== Geography ==
Abyzovo is located 2 km (1.2 mi) east of Karaidel (the district's administrative centre) by road. Karaidel is the nearest rural locality.

== Ethnicity ==
The village is inhabited by Russians and Bashkirs.
