= Khesht =

City in Fars province, Iran

Khesht Persian: خشت
- City
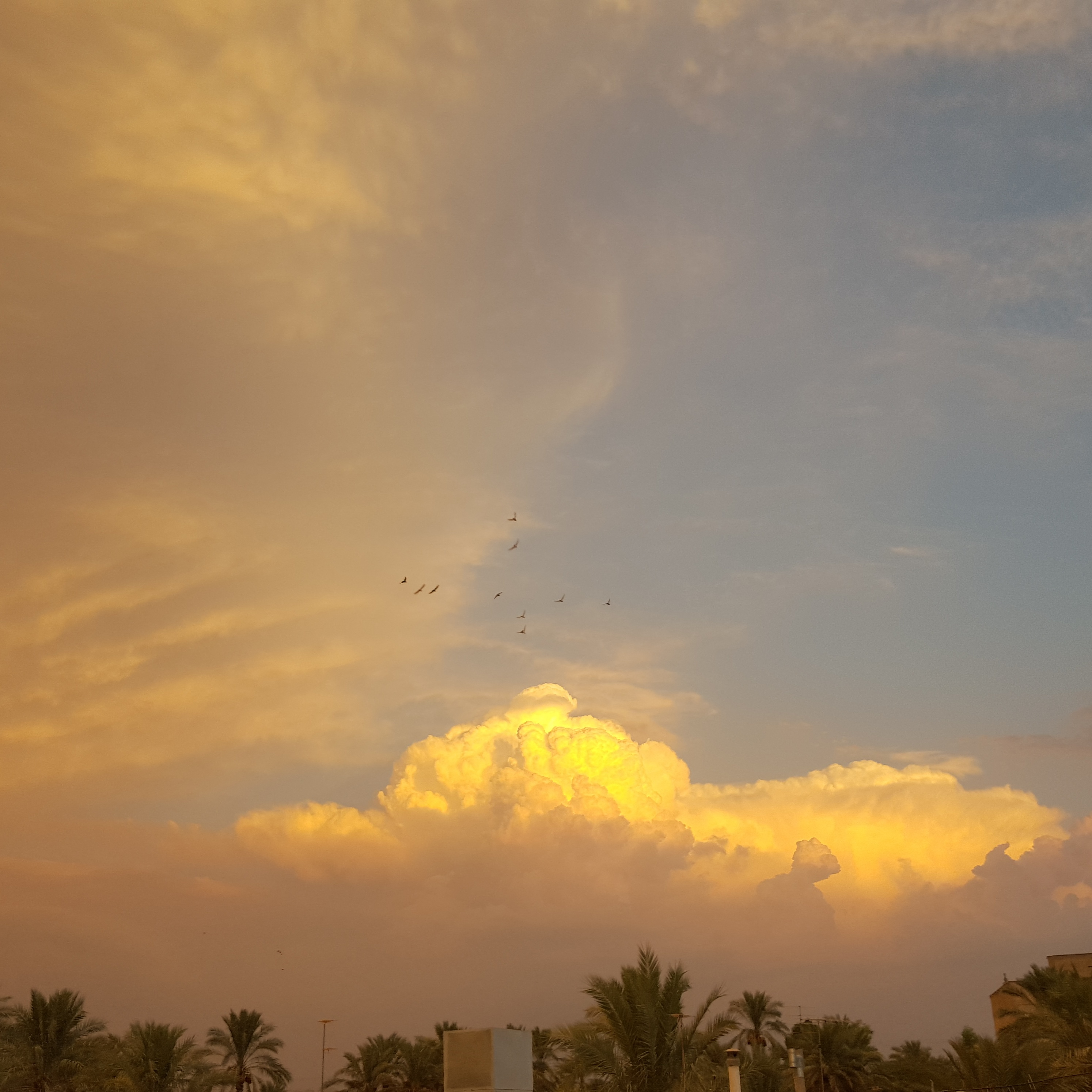

- Location within Iran
- Coordinates: 29°33′48″N 51°20′06″E
- Country: Iran
- Province: Fars
- County: Kazerun
- District: Khesht

Population (2016)
  - Total: 9,599
- Time zone: UTC+3:30 (IRST)

Khesht (Persian: خشت) (Note: Also known as Khisht) is a city in, and the capital of, Khesht District of Kazerun County, Fars province, Iran. It was the administrative center for Khesht Rural District (Note: Renamed Konartakhteh Rural District) until the administrative center was transferred to the city of Konartakhteh.

== Demographics ==
=== Population ===
At the time of the 2006 National Census, the city's population was 10,332 in 2,257 households, when it was in Khesht and Kamaraj District. (Note: Renamed Konartakhteh and Kamaraj District) The following census in 2011 counted 9,108 people in 2,343 households, by which time the city had been separated from the district in the formation of Khesht District. The 2016 census measured the population of the city as 9,599 people in 2,723 households.
