= Kamaraj Rural District =

Rural district in Fars province, Iran

Kamaraj Rural District Persian: دهستان كمارج
- Rural District
- Location within Iran
- Coordinates: 29°32′37″N 51°31′29″E
- Country: Iran
- Province: Fars
- County: Kazerun
- District: Konartakhteh and Kamaraj
- Capital: Kamaraj

Population (2016)
  - Total: 4,406
- Time zone: UTC+3:30 (IRST)

Kamaraj Rural District (Persian: دهستان كمارج) is in Konartakhteh and Kamaraj District (Note: Formerly Khesht and Kamaraj District) of Kazerun County, Fars province, Iran. Its capital is the village of Kamaraj.

== Demographics ==
=== Population ===
At the time of the 2006 National Census, the rural district's population was 4,528 in 946 households. There were 4,171 inhabitants in 1,100 households at the following census of 2011. The 2016 census measured the population of the rural district as 4,406 in 1,291 households. The most populous of its 28 villages was Kamaraj, with 944 people.
