= Famur Rural District =

Rural district in Fars province, Iran

Famur Rural District Persian: دهستان فامور
- Rural District
- Location within Iran
- Coordinates: 29°26′37″N 51°56′32″E
- Country: Iran
- Province: Fars
- County: Kazerun
- District: Jereh and Baladeh
- Capital: Nargeszar-e Famur

Population (2016)
  - Total: 8,220
- Time zone: UTC+3:30 (IRST)

Famur Rural District (Persian: دهستان فامور) is in Jereh and Baladeh District of Kazerun County, Fars province, Iran. Its capital is the village of Nargeszar-e Famur.

== Demographics ==
=== Population ===
At the time of the 2006 National Census, the rural district's population was 9,873 in 2,050 households. There were 8,658 inhabitants in 2,280 households at the following census of 2011. The 2016 census measured the population of the rural district as 8,220 in 2,313 households. The most populous of its 32 villages was Arab-e Gavmishi, with 1,137 people.
