= Dadin Rural District =

Rural district in Fars province, Iran

Dadin Rural District Persian: دهستان دادين
- Rural District
- Location within Iran
- Coordinates: 29°20′56″N 51°44′09″E
- Country: Iran
- Province: Fars
- County: Kazerun
- District: Jereh and Baladeh
- Capital: Dadin-e Olya

Population (2016)
  - Total: 7,341
- Time zone: UTC+3:30 (IRST)

Dadin Rural District (Persian: دهستان دادين) is in Jereh and Baladeh District of Kazerun County, Fars province, Iran. Its capital is the village of Dadin-e Olya.

== Demographics ==
=== Population ===
At the time of the 2006 National Census, the rural district's population was 8,556 in 1,716 households. There were 6,962 inhabitants in 1,710 households at the following census of 2011. The 2016 census measured the population of the rural district as 7,341 in 2,070 households. The most populous of its 39 villages was Sar Mashhad, with 2,818 people.
