= Konartakhteh and Kamaraj District =

District in Fars province, Iran

Konartakhteh and Kamaraj District Persian: بخش کنارتخته و کمارج
- District
- Location within Iran
- Coordinates: 29°32′37″N 51°29′27″E
- Country: Iran
- Province: Fars
- County: Kazerun
- Capital: Konartakhteh

Population (2016)
  - Total: 11,273
- Time zone: UTC+3:30 (IRST)

Konartakhteh and Kamaraj District (Persian: بخش کنارتخته و کمارج) (Note: Formerly Khesht and Kamaraj District (بخش خشت و كمارج)) is in Kazerun County, Fars province, Iran. Its capital is the city of Konartakhteh.

== History ==
After the 2006 National Census, the city of Khesht and other parts were separated from the district in the formation of Khesht District.

== Demographics ==
=== Population ===
At the time of the 2006 census, the district's population (as Khesht and Kamaraj District) was 30,229 in 6,596 households. The following census in 2011 counted 10,717 people in 2,969 households. The 2016 census measured the population of the district as 11,273 inhabitants in 3,302 households.

=== Administrative divisions ===
Konartakhteh and Kamaraj District Population
Administrative Divisions	2006	2011	2016
Kamaraj RD	4,528	4,171	4,406
Konartakhteh RD (Note: Formerly Khesht Rural District)	8,677	1,068	786
Khesht (city) (Note: Transferred to Khesht District)	10,332		
Konartakhteh (city)	6,690	5,478	6,081
Total	30,227	10,717	11,273
RD = Rural District
