= Jereh Rural District (Kazerun County) =

Rural district in Fars province, Iran

Jereh Rural District Persian: دهستان جره
- Rural District
- Location within Iran
- Coordinates: 29°17′01″N 51°55′53″E
- Country: Iran
- Province: Fars
- County: Kazerun
- District: Jereh and Baladeh
- Capital: Jereh

Population (2016)
  - Total: 13,991
- Time zone: UTC+3:30 (IRST)

Jereh Rural District (Persian: دهستان جره) is in Jereh and Baladeh District of Kazerun County, Fars province, Iran. Its capital is the village of Jereh. The previous capital of the rural district was the village of Baladeh, now the city of Valashahr.

== Demographics ==
=== Population ===
At the time of the 2006 National Census, the rural district's population was 14,950 in 3,183 households. There were 14,371 inhabitants in 3,645 households at the following census of 2011. The 2016 census measured the population of the rural district as 13,991 in 3,895 households. The most populous of its 63 villages was Jereh, with 1,589 people.
