= Khesht District =

District in Fars province, Iran

Khesht District Persian: بخش خشت
- District
- Location within Iran
- Coordinates: 29°36′06″N 51°21′59″E
- Country: Iran
- Province: Fars
- County: Kazerun
- Capital: Khesht

Population (2016)
  - Total: 15,275
- Time zone: UTC+3:30 (IRST)

Khesht District (Persian: بخش خشت) is in Kazerun County, Fars province, Iran. Its capital is the city of Khesht.

== History ==
After the 2006 National Census, the city of Khesht and other parts were separated from Khesht and Kamaraj District (Note: Renamed Konartakhteh and Kamaraj District) in the formation of Khesht District.

== Demographics ==
=== Population ===
At the time of the 2011 census, the district's population was 14,528 in 3,861 households. The 2016 census measured the population of the district as 15,275 inhabitants in 4,446 households.

=== Administrative divisions ===
Khesht District Population
Administrative Divisions	2011	2016
Buraki RD	3,368	3,685
Emamzadeh Mohammad RD	2,052	1,991
Khesht (city)	9,108	9,599
Total	14,528	15,275
RD = Rural District
