= Konartakhteh Rural District =

Rural district in Fars province, Iran

Konartakhteh Rural District Persian: دهستان کنارتخته
- Rural District
- Location within Iran
- Coordinates: 29°31′47″N 51°24′22″E
- Country: Iran
- Province: Fars
- County: Kazerun
- District: Konartakhteh and Kamaraj
- Capital: Konartakhteh

Population (2016)
  - Total: 786
- Time zone: UTC+3:30 (IRST)

Konartakhteh Rural District (Persian: دهستان کنارتخته) (Note: Formerly Khesht Rural District (دهستان خشت)) is in Konartakhteh and Kamaraj District (Note: Formerly Khesht and Kamaraj District) of Kazerun County, Fars province, Iran. It is administered from the city of Konartakhteh. The rural district was previously administered from the city of Khesht.

== Demographics ==
=== Population ===
At the time of the 2006 National Census, the rural district's population (as Khesht Rural District) was 8,677 in 1,916 households. There were 1,068 inhabitants in 307 households at the following census of 2011. The 2016 census measured the population of the rural district as 786 in 247 households. The most populous of its 21 villages was Jafar Jen, with 294 people.
