= Jereh and Baladeh District =

District in Fars province, Iran

Jereh and Baladeh District Persian: بخش جره و بالاده
- District
- Location within Iran
- Coordinates: 29°18′59″N 51°52′04″E
- Country: Iran
- Province: Fars
- County: Kazerun
- Capital: Valashahr

Population (2016)
  - Total: 35,524
- Time zone: UTC+3:30 (IRST)

Jereh and Baladeh District (Persian: بخش جره و بالاده) is in Kazerun County, Fars province, Iran. Its capital is the city of Valashahr. (Note: Formerly Baladeh)

== Demographics ==
=== Population ===
At the time of the 2006 National Census, the district's population was 37,315 in 7,805 households. The following census in 2011 counted 34,234 people in 8,766 households. The 2016 census measured the population of the district as 35,524 inhabitants in 9,967 households.

=== Administrative divisions ===
Jereh and Baladeh District Population
Administrative Divisions	2006	2011	2016
Dadin RD	8,556	6,962	7,341
Famur RD	9,873	8,658	8,220
Jereh RD	14,950	14,371	13,991
Valashahr (city)	3,936	4,243	5,972
Total	37,315	34,234	35,524
RD = Rural District
