= Kazerun County =

County in Fars province, Iran

Kazerun County Persian: شهرستان کازرون
- County
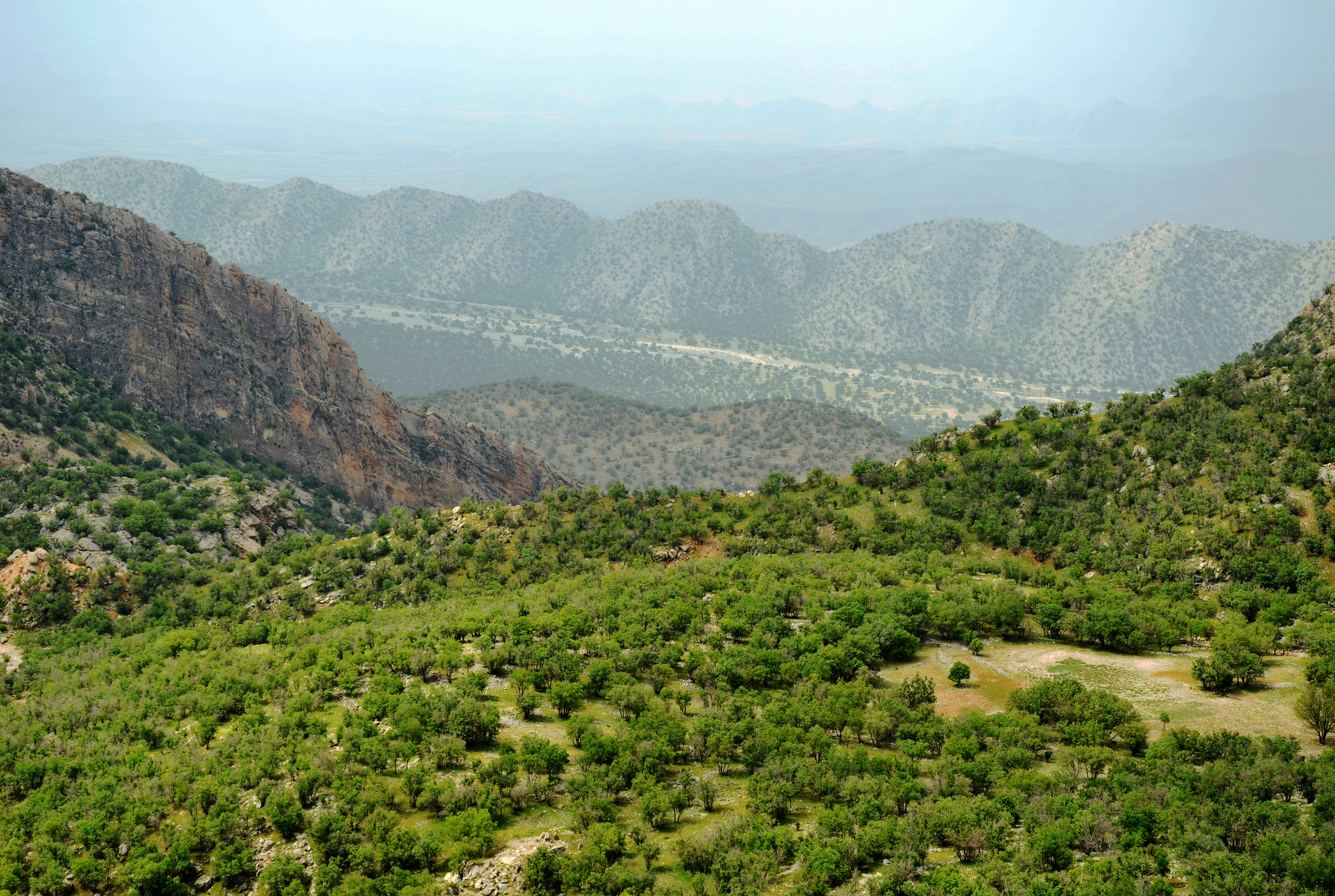
- Landscape in Kazerun

- Location of Kazerun County in Fars province (left, green)

- Location of Fars province in Iran
- Coordinates: 29°27′N 51°39′E
- Country: Iran
- Province: Fars
- Capital: Kazerun
- Districts: Central, Jereh and Baladeh, Khesht, Konartakhteh and Kamaraj

Population (2016)
  - Total: 266,217
- Time zone: UTC+3:30 (IRST)

Kazerun County (Persian: شهرستان کازرون) is in Fars province, Iran. Its capital is the city of Kazerun.

== History ==
After the 2006 National Census, the city of Khesht and other parts were separated from Khesht and Kamaraj District in the formation of Khesht District, which was divided into Buraki and Emamzadeh Mohammad Rural Districts.

In 2018, Kuhmareh and Somghan Rural Districts, and the cities of Nowdan and Qaemiyeh, were separated from the county in the establishment of Kuhchenar County. Anarestan Rural District was transferred from Chenar Shahijan District, and Dasht-e Barm Rural District from Kuhmareh District, to the Central District.

== Demographics ==
=== Population ===
At the time of the 2006 census, the county's population was 258,097, in 58,036 households. The following census in 2011 counted 254,704 people in 67,262 households. The 2016 census measured the population of the county as 266,217 in 76,227 households.

=== Administrative divisions ===
Kazerun County's population history and administrative structure over three consecutive censuses are shown in the following table.

Kazerun County Population
Administrative Divisions	2006	2011	2016
Central District	128,945	133,860	142,057
Anarestan RD			
Balyan RD	17,089	17,468	17,476
Dasht-e Barm RD			
Deris RD (Note: Formerly Chugan Rural District)	20,503	20,818	21,785
Shapur RD	6,759	5,889	6,113
Kazerun (city)	84,594	89,685	96,683
Chenar Shahijan District	42,975	43,399	45,638
Anarestan RD (Note: Transferred to the Central District after the 2016 census)	11,070	9,610	9,628
Somghan RD (Note: Transferred to Kuhchenar County after the 2016 census)	8,171	8,434	9,092
Qaemiyeh (city)	23,734	25,355	26,918
Jereh and Baladeh District	37,315	34,234	35,524
Dadin RD	8,556	6,962	7,341
Famur RD	9,873	8,658	8,220
Jereh RD	14,950	14,371	13,991
Valashahr (city) (Note: Formerly Baladeh)	3,936	4,243	5,972
Khesht District		14,528	15,275
Buraki RD		3,368	3,685
Emamzadeh Mohammad RD		2,052	1,991
Khesht (city)		9,108	9,599
Konartakhteh and Kamaraj District (Note: Formerly Khesht and Kamaraj District)	30,227	10,717	11,273
Kamaraj RD	4,528	4,171	4,406
Konartakhteh RD (Note: Formerly Khesht Rural District)	8,677	1,068	786
Khesht (city)	10,332		
Konartakhteh (city)	6,690	5,478	6,081
Kuhmareh District	18,635	17,156	16,079
Dasht-e Barm RD	6,690	5,941	6,135
Kuhmareh RD	9,356	8,641	7,052
Nowdan (city)	2,589	2,574	2,892
Total	258,097	254,704	266,217
RD = Rural District

== Geography ==
Kazerun County is bounded by Shiraz County from the east, Kuhchenar County from the north, Bushehr province from the west and south, and Farashband County from the southeast.

== Universities and higher education ==
In Kazerun, the two top universities in Kazerun are ranked based on reputation, research performance and alumni impact.

1. Salman Farsi University of Kazerun

2. Islamic Azad University, Kazerun

== See also ==
Media related to Kazerun County at Wikimedia Commons
