= Elyasabad =

Elyasabad or Eliasabad (Persian: الياس اباد) may refer to:

- Elyasabad, Kazerun, Fars Province
- Elyasabad, Shiraz, Fars Province
- Elyasabad, Ilam
- Elyasabad, Lorestan
- Elyasabad, West Azerbaijan
