= Tang-e Chowgan =

Tang-e Chowgan (Persian: تنگ چوگان) may refer to:

- Tang-e Chowgan-e Olya, a village in Iran
- Tang-e Chowgan-e Olya-ye Kashkuli, a village in Iran
- Tang-e Chowgan-e Sofla, a village in Iran
- Tang-e Chowgan-e Sofla-ye Dar Shuri, a village in Iran
- Tang-e Chowgan-e Vosta, a village in Iran
