= Dikanak =

Village in Fars province, Iran

Dikanak Persian: ديكانك
- Village
- Location within Iran
- Coordinates: 29°40′32″N 51°46′13″E
- Country: Iran
- Province: Fars
- County: Kuhchenar
- District: Kuhmareh
- Rural District: Abu ol Hayat

Population (2016)
  - Total: 1,134
- Time zone: UTC+3:30 (IRST)

Dikanak (Persian: ديكانك) (Note: Also romanized as Dīkānak) is a village in, and the capital of, Abu ol Hayat Rural District of Kuhmareh District, Kuhchenar County, Fars province, Iran.

== Demographics ==
=== Population ===
At the time of the 2006 National Census, the village's population was 1,267 in 286 households, when it was in Dasht-e Barm Rural District of Kazerun County. The following census in 2011 counted 1,318 people in 353 households. The 2016 census measured the population of the village as 1,134 people in 321 households.

In 2018, the rural district was transferred to the Central District. Dikanak was transferred to Abu ol Hayat Rural District created in Kuhmareh District of the new Kuhchenar County.
