= Malay-e Anbar =

Village in Fars province, Iran

Malay-e Anbar Persian: ملاي انبار
- Village
- Location within Iran
- Coordinates: 29°49′29″N 51°38′08″E
- Country: Iran
- Province: Fars
- County: Kuhchenar
- District: Kuhmareh
- Rural District: Kuhmareh

Population (2016)
  - Total: 4,594
- Time zone: UTC+3:30 (IRST)

Malay-e Anbar (Persian: ملاي انبار) (Note: Also romanized as Malāy-e Ānbār; also known as Malā-ye Anbār and Moleh-ye Anbār)) is a village in, and the capital of, Kuhmareh Rural District of Kuhmareh District, Kuhchenar County, Fars province, Iran. The rural district was previously administered from the city of Nowdan. Malay-e Anbar was the capital of Somghan Rural District until its capital was transferred to the village of Somghan.

== Demographics ==
=== Population ===
At the time of the 2006 National Census, the village's population was 2,879 in 618 households, when it was in Somghan Rural District of the former Chenar Shahijan District of Kazerun County. The following census in 2011 counted 3,482 people in 929 households. The 2016 census measured the population of the village as 4,594 people in 1,258 households. It was the most populous village in its rural district.

In 2018, the rural district was separated from the county in the establishment of Kuhchenar County and was transferred to the new Central District. Malay-e Anbar was transferred to Kuhmareh Rural District in Kuhmareh District.
