= Aliabad, Dasht-e Barm =

Village in Fars province, Iran

Aliabad Persian: علي اباد
- Village
- Country: Iran
- Province: Fars
- County: Kazerun
- District: Central
- Rural District: Dasht-e Barm

Population (2016)
  - Total: 109
- Time zone: UTC+3:30 (IRST)

Aliabad (Persian: علي اباد) (Note: Also romanized as 'Alīābād) is a village in Dasht-e Barm Rural District of the Central District of Kazerun County, Fars province, Iran.

== Demographics ==
=== Population ===
At the time of the 2006 National Census, the village's population was 114 in 25 households, when it was in Kuhmareh District. The following census in 2011 counted 108 people in 26 households. The 2016 census measured the population of the village as 109 people in 32 households.

After the census, the rural district was transferred to the Central District.
