= Ganjeh =

Ganjeh may refer to:

== Azerbaijan ==
- Ganja, Azerbaijan

== Iran ==
- Ganjeh, Fars
- Ganjeh, Gilan
- Ganjeh, Hamadan
- Ganjeh, Ilam
- Ganjeh, Isfahan
- Ganjeh, Kohgiluyeh and Boyer-Ahmad
