= Khoshkabad =

Khoshkabad (Persian: خشك اباد) may refer to:

- Khoshkabad, Fars
- Khoshkabad, Hormozgan
- Khoshkabad, Isfahan
- Khoshkabad, Yazd
