= Somghan =

Village in Fars province, Iran

Somghan Persian: سمغان
- Village
- Location within Iran
- Coordinates: 29°52′37″N 51°39′56″E
- Country: Iran
- Province: Fars
- County: Kuhchenar
- District: Central
- Rural District: Somghan

Population (2016)
  - Total: 1,188
- Time zone: UTC+3:30 (IRST)

Somghan (Persian: سمغان) (Note: Also romanized as Samghān and Somghān; also known as Samqān) is a village in, and the capital of, Somghan Rural District of the Central District of Kuhchenar County, Fars province, Iran. The previous capital of the rural district was the village of Malay-e Anbar.

== Demographics ==
=== Population ===
At the time of the 2006 National Census, the village's population was 2,128 in 414 households, when it was in the former Chenar Shahijan District of Kazerun County. The following census in 2011 counted 1,677 people in 447 households. The 2016 census measured the population of the village as 1,188 people in 336 households.

In 2018, the rural district was separated from the county in the establishment of Kuhchenar County and was transferred to the new Central District.
