= Chenar Shahijan Rural District =

Rural district in Fars province, Iran

Chenar Shahijan Rural District Persian: دهستان چنارشاهیجان
- Rural District
- Location within Iran
- Coordinates: 29°47′20″N 51°31′09″E
- Country: Iran
- Province: Fars
- County: Kuhchenar
- District: Central
- Capital: Hakim Bashi-ye Bala
- Time zone: UTC+3:30 (IRST)

Chenar Shahijan Rural District (Persian: دهستان چنارشاهیجان) is in the Central District of Kuhchenar County, Fars province, Iran. Its capital is the village of Hakim Bashi-ye Bala, whose population at the time of the National Census of 2016 was 1,634 in 479 households.

In 2018, Kuhmareh and Somghan Rural Districts, and the cities of Nowdan and Qaemiyeh, were separated from Kazerun County in the establishment of Kuhchenar County. Chenar Shahijan Rural District was created in the new Central District.
