= Hakim Bashi-ye Bala =

Village in Fars province, Iran

Hakim Bashi-ye Bala Persian: حكيم باشي بالا
- Village
- Location within Iran
- Coordinates: 29°47′32″N 51°33′05″E
- Country: Iran
- Province: Fars
- County: Kuhchenar
- District: Central
- Rural District: Chenar Shahijan

Population (2016)
  - Total: 1,634
- Time zone: UTC+3:30 (IRST)

Hakim Bashi-ye Bala (Persian: حكيم باشي بالا) (Note: Also romanized as Ḩakīm Bāshī-ye Bālā; also known as Ḩakīm Bāshī-ye Ḩoseynābād, Ḩakīmbāshī ‘Olyā, Neşf-e Mīān, Qal‘eh Hakīm Bāshi Bāla, and Qal‘eh-ye Ḩakīm Bāshī) is a village in, and the capital of, Chenar Shahijan Rural District of the Central District of Kuhchenar County, Fars province, Iran.

== Demographics ==
=== Population ===
At the time of the 2006 National Census, the village's population was 1,959 in 429 households, when it was in Anarestan Rural District of the former Chenar Shahijan District of Kazerun County. The following census in 2011 counted 1,783 people in 531 households. The 2016 census measured the population of the village as 1,634 people in 479 households. It was the most populous village in its rural district.

After the census, the rural district was transferred to the Central District of Kazerun County. Hakim Bashi-ye Bala was transferred to Chenar Shahijan Rural District created in the new Central District of Kuhchenar County.
