= Panj Mahall =

Panj Mahall پنج محل
- Village
- Location within Iran
- Coordinates: 29°46′18″N 51°34′18″E
- Country: Iran
- Province: Fars
- County: Kazerun
- Bakhsh: Central
- Rural District: Shapur

Population (2006)
  - Total: 121
- Time zone: UTC+3:30 (IRST)
  - Summer (DST): UTC+4:30 (IRDT)

Panj Mahall (Persian: پنج محل, also Romanized as Panj Maḩal and Panj Maḩall) is a village in Shapur Rural District, in the Central District of Kazerun County, Fars province, Iran. At the 2006 census, its population was 121, in 22 families.
