= Abu Ali, Iran =

Abu Ali ابوعلي
- Village
- Location within Iran
- Coordinates: 29°31′56″N 51°41′39″E
- Country: Iran
- Province: Fars
- County: Kazerun
- Bakhsh: Central
- Rural District: Balyan

Population (2006)
  - Total: 1,627
- Time zone: UTC+3:30 (IRST)
  - Summer (DST): UTC+4:30 (IRDT)

Abu Ali (Persian: ابوعلي, also Romanized as Abū 'Alī) is a village in Balyan Rural District, in the Central District of Kazerun County, Fars province, Iran. At the 2006 census, its population was 1,627, in 299 families.
