= Tall Roshtan =

Tall Roshtan تل رشتان
- Village
- Country: Iran
- Province: Fars
- County: Kazerun
- Bakhsh: Central
- Rural District: Deris

Population (2006)
  - Total: 440
- Time zone: UTC+3:30 (IRST)
  - Summer (DST): UTC+4:30 (IRDT)

Tall Roshtan (Persian: تل رشتان, also Romanized as Tall Roshtān) is a village in Deris Rural District, in the Central District of Kazerun County, Fars province, Iran. At the 2006 census, its population was 440, in 83 families.
