= Tall-e Kushk =

Tall-e Kushk تل كوشك
- Village
- Location within Iran
- Coordinates: 29°45′59″N 51°32′43″E
- Country: Iran
- Province: Fars
- County: Kazerun
- Bakhsh: Chenar Shahijan
- Rural District: Anarestan

Population (2006)
  - Total: 1,413
- Time zone: UTC+3:30 (IRST)
  - Summer (DST): UTC+4:30 (IRDT)

Tall-e Kushk (Persian: تل كوشك, also Romanized as Tall-e Kūshk, Tol-e Kūshak, and Tol-e Kūshk; also known as Tal-e Gūk, Tal-e Kūk, Tol-e Kūsh, Tol-Kucak, and Tul Gowak) is a village in Anarestan Rural District, Chenar Shahijan District, Kazerun County, Fars province, Iran. At the 2006 census, its population was 1,413, in 299 families.
