= Borj Sukhteh =

Borj Sukhteh (Persian: برج سوخته) may refer to:

- Borj Sukhteh-ye Olya
- Borj Sukhteh-ye Sofla
