= Kuhmareh =

Kuhmareh (Persian: کوهمره) may refer to:

- Kuhmareh District, an administrative division of Kuhchenar County, Fars province, Iran
- Kuhmareh Rural District, an administrative division of Kuhchenar County, Fars province, Iran
- Kuh Mareh Sorkhi Rural District, an administrative division of Shiraz County, Fars province, Iran
- Kuh Mareh Khami Rural District, an administrative division of Basht County, Kohgiluyeh and Boyer-Ahmad province, Iran
