= Tall Milak =

Tall Milak تل ميلك
- Village
- Location within Iran
- Coordinates: 29°51′57″N 51°36′43″E
- Country: Iran
- Province: Fars
- County: Kazerun
- Bakhsh: Chenar Shahijan
- Rural District: Somghan

Population (2006)
  - Total: 395
- Time zone: UTC+3:30 (IRST)
  - Summer (DST): UTC+4:30 (IRDT)

Tall Milak (Persian: تل ميلك, also Romanized as Tall Mīlak and Tal-e Mīlak) is a village in Somghan Rural District, Chenar Shahijan District, Kazerun County, Fars province, Iran. At the 2006 census, its population was 395, in 87 families.
