= Aliabad-e Dutu =

Aliabad-e Dutu علي اباددوتو
- Village
- Location within Iran
- Coordinates: 29°30′39″N 51°41′41″E
- Country: Iran
- Province: Fars
- County: Kazerun
- Bakhsh: Central
- Rural District: Balyan

Population (2006)
  - Total: 219
- Time zone: UTC+3:30 (IRST)
  - Summer (DST): UTC+4:30 (IRDT)

Aliabad-e Dutu (Persian: علي اباددوتو, also Romanized as 'Alīābād-e Dūtū; also known as 'Alīābād, Alīābād-e Dotū, and 'Alīābād-e Now) is a village in Balyan Rural District, in the Central District of Kazerun County, Fars province, Iran. At the 2017 census, its population was 219, in 60 families.
