= Kalani, Fars =

Village in Fars province, Iran

Kalani Persian: كلاني
- Village
- Location within Iran
- Coordinates: 29°35′25″N 51°52′14″E
- Country: Iran
- Province: Fars
- County: Kazerun
- District: Central
- Rural District: Dasht-e Barm

Population (2016)
  - Total: 1,985
- Time zone: UTC+3:30 (IRST)

Kalani (Persian: كلاني) (Note: Also romanized as Kalānī) is a village in, and the capital of, Dasht-e Barm Rural District of the Central District of Kazerun County, Fars province, Iran.

== Demographics ==
=== Population ===
At the time of the 2006 National Census, the village's population was 1,729 in 368 households, when it was in Kuhmareh District. The following census in 2011 counted 1,710 people in 433 households. The 2016 census measured the population of the village as 1,985 people in 560 households. It was the most populous village in its rural district.

After the census, the rural district was transferred to the Central District.
