= Puzeh Badi =

Puzeh Badi پوزه بادي
- Village
- Location within Iran
- Coordinates: 29°33′31″N 51°46′07″E
- Country: Iran
- Province: Fars
- County: Kazerun
- Bakhsh: Central
- Rural District: Balyan

Population (2006)
  - Total: 344
- Time zone: UTC+3:30 (IRST)
  - Summer (DST): UTC+4:30 (IRDT)

Puzeh Badi (Persian: پوزه بادي, also Romanized as Pūzeh Bādī; also known as Pūzeh Ābādī) is a village in Balyan Rural District, in the Central District of Kazerun County, Fars province, Iran. At the 2006 census, its population was 344, in 76 families.
