= Jam Bozorgi =

Jam Bozorgi جام بزرگي
- Village
- Location within Iran
- Coordinates: 29°40′46″N 51°35′23″E
- Country: Iran
- Province: Fars
- County: Kazerun
- Bakhsh: Central
- Rural District: Deris

Population (2006)
  - Total: 921
- Time zone: UTC+3:30 (IRST)
  - Summer (DST): UTC+4:30 (IRDT)

Jam Bozorgi (Persian: جام بزرگي, also Romanized as Jām Bozorgī; also known as Jāmeh Bozorgī) is a village in Kazerun County, Fars province, Iran. At the 2006 census, its population was 921, in 182 families.

== See also ==
- List of cities, towns and villages in Fars province
