= Burenjan =

Burenjan بورنجان
- Village
- Location within Iran
- Coordinates: 29°29′20″N 51°58′43″E
- Country: Iran
- Province: Fars
- County: Kazerun
- Bakhsh: Kuhmareh
- Rural District: Dasht-e Barm

Population (2006)
  - Total: 407
- Time zone: UTC+3:30 (IRST)
  - Summer (DST): UTC+4:30 (IRDT)

Burenjan (Persian: بورنجان, also Romanized as Būrenjān; also known as Burinjun) is a village in Dasht-e Barm Rural District, Kuhmareh District, Kazerun County, Fars province, Iran. At the 2006 census, its population was 407, in 90 families.
