= Abu ol Hayat =

Tengeh e Ario Barzan تنگه آریوبرزن
- Village
- Location within Iran
- Coordinates: 29°41′59″N 51°46′48″E
- Country: Iran
- Province: Fars
- County: Kazerun
- Bakhsh: Kuhmareh
- Rural District: Kuhmareh

Population (2006)
  - Total: 805
- Time zone: UTC+3:30 (IRST)
  - Summer (DST): UTC+4:30 (IRDT)

Ario Barzan (Persian: آریو برزن, also Romanized as Ario Barzan; and Tang-e Ario Barzan) is a village in Kuhmareh Rural District, Kuhmareh District, Kazerun County, Fars province, Iran. At the 2006 census, its population was 805, in 176 families.
