= Pol-e Abgineh =

Pol-e Abgineh پل ابگينه
- Village
- Location within Iran
- Coordinates: 29°33′30″N 51°45′50″E
- Country: Iran
- Province: Fars
- County: Kazerun
- Bakhsh: Central
- Rural District: Balyan

Population (2006)
  - Total: 365
- Time zone: UTC+3:30 (IRST)
  - Summer (DST): UTC+4:30 (IRDT)

Pol-e Abgineh (Persian: پل ابگينه, also Romanized as Pol-e Ābgīneh; also known as Deh-i-Pul-i-Ābgīneh, Dehpol Ābgīneh, and Pol-e Āgīneh) is a village in Balyan Rural District, in the Central District of Kazerun County, Fars province, Iran. At the 2006 census, its population was 365, in 83 families.
