= Amui =

Amui (Persian: عمويي) may refer to:

- Amui, Kazerun
- Amui, Mamasani
