= Dosiran =

Dosiran دوسيران
- village
- Location within Iran
- Coordinates: 29°47′06″N 51°47′03″E
- Country: Iran
- Province: Fars
- County: Kazerun
- Bakhsh: Kuhmareh
- Rural District: Kuhmareh

Population (2006)
  - Total: 2,424
- Time zone: UTC+3:30 (IRST)
  - Summer (DST): UTC+4:30 (IRDT)

Dosiran (Persian: دوسيران, also Romanized as Doosīrān; also known as Do Sarān, 'and'Doserū', and Dow Sarān) is a village in Kuhmareh Rural District, Kuhmareh District, Kazerun County, Fars province, Iran. At the 2006 census, its population was 2,424, in 591 families.
