= Tall Kuhak =

Tall Kuhak تل كوهك
- Village
- Location within Iran
- Coordinates: 29°44′15″N 51°35′09″E
- Country: Iran
- Province: Fars
- County: Kazerun
- Bakhsh: Chenar Shahijan
- Rural District: Anarestan

Population (2006)
  - Total: 332
- Time zone: UTC+3:30 (IRST)
  - Summer (DST): UTC+4:30 (IRDT)

Tall Kuhak (Persian: تل كوهك, also Romanized as Tall Kūhak; also known as Tall Gūk) is a village in Anarestan Rural District, Chenar Shahijan District, Kazerun County, Fars province, Iran. At the 2006 census, its population was 332, in 75 families.
