= Children killed during the 2025–2026 Iranian protests =

- Location: Iran
- Date: 30 December 2025 – present (10 months and 1 day)
- Target: 2025–26 Iranian protests
- Attack type: Massacre, mass murder, mass shooting, executions, summary executions
- Deaths: 226 children
- Perpetrators: Government of Iran and allied foreign Shia militias

Children killed during the 2025–2026 Iranian protests refers to reports on the deaths of individuals under the age of 18 during the 2025–2026 Iranian protests. According to data published by non-governmental human rights organizations such as the Human Rights Activists News Agency (HRANA) and the Iran Human Rights, by late January 2026 the identities of at least 118 children and adolescents had been verified. Out of 42,486 total arrests, 326 were children, adolescents, and students.

Many of these individuals were killed during street clashes as a result of gunshot wounds or injuries caused by riot control weapons. IRGC authorities have not released an official, disaggregated figure for the number of children killed; however, in some cases they have attributed the deaths to what they describe as "terrorist elements" or "rioters".

== Statistics and geographical distribution ==
Human rights reports indicate that the highest number of underage fatalities were recorded in the provinces of Lorestan, Kurdistan, and Fars.

=== Causes of death ===
According to reports by Amnesty International, the majority of these deaths resulted from the use of lethal weapons in densely populated areas, as well as physical violence occurring in detention centers, hospitals, or during protest gatherings.

== List of identified individuals ==
This table is based on lists published by the Coordination Council of Iranian Teachers’ Trade Associations and verified by independent human rights organizations.

Name	Age	Location	Reported cause	Source
Mostafa Fallahi	15	Azna	Gunshot wound	
Taha Safari	15	Azna	Gunshot wound	
Mohammad Qasem Rousta	14	Marvdasht	Projectile impact to the head	
Bahar Hosseini	3	Neyshabur	Complications caused by tear gas	
Amirali Heydari	17	Kermanshah	Cranial trauma	
Reza Ghanbari	16	Kermanshah	Live ammunition	
Abolfazl Dehghani	16	Bijar	Gunshot wound	
Mohammadreza Madani	17	Marlik	Gunshot wound	
Amirali Parvizi	Unknown	Unknown	Unknown	
Mostafa Sarafraz Ardakani	Unknown	Unknown	Unknown	
Amirhossein Dowlatabadi	Unknown	Unknown	Unknown	
Kiavash Mirghasemi	Unknown	Unknown	Unknown	
Ghazal Janghorban	15	Isfahan	Gunshot wound	
Amirhesam Khodayari	Unknown	Unknown	Unknown	
Sina Ashkboosi	17	Tehran	Gunshot wound	
Mehrdad Sadeghi	Unknown	Unknown	Unknown	
Benyamin Mohammadi	15	Tehran	Gunshot wound	
Abolfazl Beigmohammadi	Unknown	Unknown	Unknown	
Arnica Dabbagh	Unknown	Gorgan	Gunshot wound	
Amirarsalan Bahmaninejad	Unknown	Unknown	Unknown	
Abolfazl Bakhtiarpour Douraki	Unknown	Unknown	Unknown	
Borna Dehghani	17	Tehranpars, Tehran	Gunshot wound	
Abolfazl Bajoul	16	Unknown	Unknown	
Rebin Moradi	17	Tehran	Unknown	
Melina Asadi	3	Javanrud	Gunshot wound	
Bahar Shadmehri	17	Nishapur	Unknown	
Arian Ghasemizadeh	16	Unknown	Sniper shot back of the head	
Nazanin Zahra Salehi	13	Kermanshah	Gunshot wound	
Raham Saadati	17	Karaj	Gunshot wound	
Jabbar Panahi Azad	15	Qaemiyeh	Gunshot wound to the head	
Kimia Kamyab	17	Eslamshahr	Gunshot wound to the chest	
Milad Hassanzadeh	17	Tehran	Two gunshots	
Armin Soltanmohammadi	Unknown	Unknown	Unknown	
Faizeh Izadi	Unknown	Sabzevar	Unknown	
Sahand Naseri	15	Eshtehard	Three gunshots to the heart	
Arian Salemi Raad	16	Bushehr	Pellet gun wound to the head	

=== Reports by teachers’ trade associations ===
On 24 January 2026, the Coordination Council of Iranian Teachers’ Trade Associations published the names of 32 students who were killed. The list includes students from various cities across Iran whose identities were verified by the organization.

== Violations of international protocols ==
Numerous international organizations, including child rights advocates, have stated that the treatment of individuals under the age of 18 during the protests violates the provisions of the Convention on the Rights of the Child, to which Iran is a signatory. Under the convention, states are obligated to ensure the safety and protection of children in all circumstances.

== See also ==
- 2025–2026 Iranian protests
- 2026 Iran massacres
- Human rights in the Islamic Republic of Iran
