= Tang-e Zard =

Tang-e Zard (Persian: تنگ زرد) may refer to:

- Tang-e Zard, Bushehr
- Tang-e Zard, Fars
- Tang-e Zard, Kohgiluyeh and Boyer-Ahmad
