= Galeh Dani Hajj Askar Jowkar =

Galeh Dani Hajj Askar Jowkar گله داني حاج عسكرجوكار
- Village
- Country: Iran
- Province: Fars
- County: Kazerun
- Bakhsh: Central
- Rural District: Deris

Population (2006)
  - Total: 79
- Time zone: UTC+3:30 (IRST)
  - Summer (DST): UTC+4:30 (IRDT)

Galeh Dani Hajj Askar Jowkar (Persian: گله داني حاج عسكرجوكار, also Romanized as Galeh Dānī Ḩājj 'Askar Jowkār) is a village in Deris Rural District, in the Central District of Kazerun County, Fars province, Iran. At the 2006 census, its population was 79, in 23 families.
