= Kaman Keshi =

Kaman Keshi كمانكشي
- Village
- Location within Iran
- Coordinates: 29°33′51″N 51°43′03″E
- Country: Iran
- Province: Fars
- County: Kazerun
- Bakhsh: Central
- Rural District: Balyan

Population (2006)
  - Total: 251
- Time zone: UTC+3:30 (IRST)
  - Summer (DST): UTC+4:30 (IRDT)

Kaman Keshi (Persian: كمانكشي, also Romanized as Kamān Keshī) is a village in Balyan Rural District, in the Central District of Kazerun County, Fars province, Iran. At the 2006 census, its population was 251, in 44 families.
