= Papun, Iran =

Papun (Persian: پاپون) in Iran may refer to:

- Papun-e Olya
- Papun-e Sofla
