= Kasakan =

Kasakan كاسكان
- Village
- Location within Iran
- Coordinates: 29°35′52″N 51°36′27″E
- Country: Iran
- Province: Fars
- County: Kazerun
- Bakhsh: Central
- Rural District: Deris

Population (2006)
  - Total: 750
- Time zone: UTC+3:30 (IRST)
  - Summer (DST): UTC+4:30 (IRDT)

Kasakan (Persian: كاسكان, also Romanized as Kasakān and Kāskān; also known as Qazqān) is a village in Deris Rural District, in the Central District of Kazerun County, Fars province, Iran. At the 2006 census, its population was 750, in 169 families.
