= Tarreh Dan =

Tarreh Dan تره دان
- Village
- Location within Iran
- Coordinates: 29°48′22″N 51°39′22″E
- Country: Iran
- Province: Fars
- County: Kazerun
- Bakhsh: Kuhmareh
- Rural District: Kuhmareh

Population (2006)
  - Total: 1,184
- Time zone: UTC+3:30 (IRST)
  - Summer (DST): UTC+4:30 (IRDT)

Tarreh Dan (Persian: تره دان, also Romanized as Tarreh Dān and Tareh Dān) is a village in Kuhmareh Rural District, Kuhmareh District, Kazerun County, Fars province, Iran. At the 2006 census, its population was 1,184, in 255 families.
