= Gav Koshak =

Gav Koshak گاوكشك
- Village
- Location within Iran
- Coordinates: 29°38′42″N 51°48′45″E
- Country: Iran
- Province: Fars
- County: Kazerun
- Bakhsh: Kuhmareh
- Rural District: Dasht-e Barm

Population (2006)
  - Total: 580
- Time zone: UTC+3:30 (IRST)
  - Summer (DST): UTC+4:30 (IRDT)

Gav Koshak (Persian: گاوكشك, also Romanized as Gāv Koshak; also known as Gāv Koshak-e 'Olyā and Gāv Kushak) is a village in Dasht-e Barm Rural District, Kuhmareh District, Kazerun County, Fars province, Iran. At the 2006 census, its population was 580, in 151 families.
