= Ayazabad =

Ayazabad (Persian: ايازاباد) may refer to:

- Ayazabad, Fars
- Ayazabad, Lorestan
