= Hakim Bashi =

Hakim Bashi (Persian: حكيم باشي) may refer to:

- Hakim Bashi-ye Bala
- Hakim Bashi-ye Hoseynabad
