= Tang-e Qalangi =

Tang-e Qalangi تنگ قلنگي
- Village
- Country: Iran
- Province: Fars
- County: Kazerun
- Bakhsh: Kuhmareh
- Rural District: Dasht-e Barm

Population (2006)
  - Total: 79
- Time zone: UTC+3:30 (IRST)
  - Summer (DST): UTC+4:30 (IRDT)

Tang-e Qalangi (Persian: تنگ قلنگي, also Romanized as Tang-e Qalangī) is a village in Dasht-e Barm Rural District, Kuhmareh District, Kazerun County, Fars province, Iran. At the 2006 census, its population was 79, in 19 families.
