= Gorgdan =

Gorgdan گرگدان
- Village
- Location within Iran
- Coordinates: 29°44′47″N 51°44′01″E
- Country: Iran
- Province: Fars
- County: Kazerun
- Bakhsh: Kuhmareh
- Rural District: Kuhmareh

Population (2006)
  - Total: 662
- Time zone: UTC+3:30 (IRST)
  - Summer (DST): UTC+4:30 (IRDT)

Gorgdan (Persian: گرگدان, also Romanized as Gorgdān) is a village in Kuhmareh Rural District, Kuhmareh District, Kazerun County, Fars province, Iran. At the 2006 census, its population was 662, in 162 families.
