= Emamzadeh Pir Abu ol Hasan =

Emamzadeh Pir Abu ol Hasan امامزاده پيرابوالحسن
- Village
- Location within Iran
- Coordinates: 29°40′21″N 51°46′53″E
- Country: Iran
- Province: Fars
- County: Kazerun
- Bakhsh: Kuhmareh
- Rural District: Dasht-e Barm

Population (2006)
  - Total: 511
- Time zone: UTC+3:30 (IRST)
  - Summer (DST): UTC+4:30 (IRDT)

Emamzadeh Pir Abu ol Hasan (Persian: امامزاده پيرابوالحسن, also Romanized as Emāmzādeh Pīr Abū ol Ḩasan; also known as Emāmzādeh Abū ol Ḩasan, Pīr Abul Hasan, Pīr Abū ol Ḩasan, Shāhzādeh Abū ol Ḩasan, and Sheykh Abū ol Ḩasan) is a village in Dasht-e Barm Rural District, Kuhmareh District, Kazerun County, Fars province, Iran. At the 2006 census, its population was 511, in 106 families.
