= Parak =

Parak (Persian: پاراك) may refer to:

- Parak, Bushehr
- Parak, Fars
- Parak, Jahrom, Fars Province
- Parak, Lali, Khuzestan Province
