= Rashnabad =

Rashnabad رشن اباد
- Village
- Location within Iran
- Coordinates: 29°46′53″N 51°32′50″E
- Country: Iran
- Province: Fars
- County: Kazerun
- Bakhsh: Chenar Shahijan
- Rural District: Anarestan

Population (2006)
  - Total: 1,877
- Time zone: UTC+3:30 (IRST)
  - Summer (DST): UTC+4:30 (IRDT)

Rashnabad (Persian: رشن اباد, also Romanized as Rashnābād) is a village in Anarestan Rural District, Chenar Shahijan District, Kazerun County, Fars province, Iran. At the 2006 census, its population was 1,877, in 394 families.
