= Gachkharan =

Gachkharan گچ خران
- Village
- Location within Iran
- Coordinates: 29°44′54″N 51°34′22″E
- Country: Iran
- Province: Fars
- County: Kazerun
- Bakhsh: Chenar Shahijan
- Rural District: Anarestan

Population (2006)
  - Total: 279
- Time zone: UTC+3:30 (IRST)
  - Summer (DST): UTC+4:30 (IRDT)

Gachkharan (Persian: گچ خران, also Romanized as Gachkharān; also known as Gachgarān, Gach Gīrān, and Gackgarān) is a village in Anarestan Rural District, Chenar Shahijan District, Kazerun County, Fars province, Iran. At the 2006 census, its population was 279, in 55 families.
