= Pir Sabz =

Pir Sabz or Pir-e Sabz (Persian: پيرسبز) may refer to:

- Pir-e Sabz, Fars
- Pir Sabz, Rostam, Fars Province
- Pir Sabz, Kohgiluyeh and Boyer-Ahmad
- Pir-e Sabz, Yazd
