= Tall Anjir =

Tall Anjir or Tol Anjir (Persian: تل انجير) may refer to:

- Tall Anjir, Kazerun
- Tall Anjir, Mamasani
