= Anarestan, Fars =

Village in Fars province, Iran

Anarestan Persian: انارستان
- Village
- Location within Iran
- Coordinates: 29°44′51″N 51°32′22″E
- Country: Iran
- Province: Fars
- County: Kazerun
- District: Central
- Rural District: Anarestan

Population (2016)
  - Total: 754
- Time zone: UTC+3:30 (IRST)

Anarestan (Persian: انارستان) (Note: Also romanized as Anārestān) is a village in, and the capital of, Anarestan Rural District of the Central District of Kazerun County, Fars province, Iran. It was previously the capital of Shapur Rural District before its capital was transferred to the village of Seyyed Hoseyn.

== Demographics ==
=== Population ===
At the time of the 2006 National Census, the village's population was 927 in 186 households, when it was in the former Chenar Shahijan District. The following census in 2011 counted 747 people in 213 households. The 2016 census measured the population of the village as 754 people in 210 households.

After the census, the rural district was transferred to the Central District.
