= Zavali =

Zavali زوالي
- Village
- Location within Iran
- Coordinates: 29°33′10″N 51°46′44″E
- Country: Iran
- Province: Fars
- County: Kazerun
- Bakhsh: Central
- Rural District: Balyan

Population (2006)
  - Total: 634
- Time zone: UTC+3:30 (IRST)
  - Summer (DST): UTC+4:30 (IRDT)

Zavali (Persian: زوالي, also Romanized as Zavālī) is a village in Balyan Rural District, in the Central District of Kazerun County, Fars province, Iran. At the 2006 census, its population was 634, in 121 families.
