= Derk Mah Shuri =

Derk Mah Shuri درك ماه شوري
- Village
- Country: Iran
- Province: Fars
- County: Kazerun
- Bakhsh: Central
- Rural District: Balyan

Population (2006)
  - Total: 41
- Time zone: UTC+3:30 (IRST)
  - Summer (DST): UTC+4:30 (IRDT)

Derk Mah Shuri (Persian: درك ماه شوري, also Romanized as Derk Māh Shūrī) is a village located in Balyan Rural District, in the Central District of Kazerun County, Fars province, Iran. At the 2006 census, its population was 41, in 8 families.
