= Rustai-ye Shahid Bahonar =

Rustai-ye Shahid Bahonar روستاي شهيدباهنر
- Village
- Country: Iran
- Province: Fars
- County: Kazerun
- Bakhsh: Central
- Rural District: Shapur

Population (2006)
  - Total: 243
- Time zone: UTC+3:30 (IRST)
  - Summer (DST): UTC+4:30 (IRDT)

Rustai-ye Shahid Bahonar (Persian: روستاي شهيدباهنر, also Romanized as Rūstāī-ye Shahīd Bāhonar) is a village in Shapur Rural District, in the Central District of Kazerun County, Fars province, Iran. At the 2006 census, its population was 243, in 54 families.
