= Haft Pareh =

Haft Pareh هفتپاره
- Village
- Location within Iran
- Coordinates: 29°45′42″N 51°34′19″E
- Country: Iran
- Province: Fars
- County: Kazerun
- Bakhsh: Central
- Rural District: Shapur

Population (2006)
  - Total: 69
- Time zone: UTC+3:30 (IRST)
  - Summer (DST): UTC+4:30 (IRDT)

Haft Pareh (Persian: هفتپاره, also Romanized as Haft Pāreh) is a village in Shapur Rural District, in the Central District of Kazerun County, Fars province, Iran. At the 2006 census, its population was 69, in 16 families.
