= Dasht-e Barm =

Dasht-e Barm دشت برم
- Village
- Location within Iran
- Coordinates: 29°33′20″N 51°53′21″E
- Country: Iran
- Province: Fars
- County: Kazerun
- Bakhsh: Kuhmareh
- Rural District: Dasht-e Barm

Population (2006)
  - Total: 472
- Time zone: UTC+3:30 (IRST)
  - Summer (DST): UTC+4:30 (IRDT)

Dasht-e Barm (Persian: دشت برم; also known as Dasht-e Bar) is a village in Dasht-e Barm Rural District, Kuhmareh District, Kazerun County, Fars province, Iran. At the 2006 census, its population was 472, in 89 families.
