= Chekak =

Village in Fars province, Iran

Chekak Persian: چكك
- Village
- Location within Iran
- Coordinates: 29°48′45″N 51°41′16″E
- Country: Iran
- Province: Fars
- County: Kuhchenar
- District: Kuhmareh
- Rural District: Kuhmareh

Population (2016)
  - Total: 1,208
- Time zone: UTC+3:30 (IRST)

Chekak (Persian: چكك) (Note: Also known as Chegak and Jakak) is a village in Kuhmareh Rural District of Kuhmareh District, Kuhchenar County, Fars province, Iran.

== Demographics ==
=== Population ===
At the time of the 2006 National Census, the village's population was 1,224 in 285 households, when it was in Kazerun County. The following census in 2011 counted 1,301 people in 334 households. The 2016 census measured the population of the village as 1,208 people in 345 households. It was the most populous village in its rural district.

In 2018, the rural district was separated from the county in the establishment of Kuhchenar County.
