= Tang-e Chowgan-e Vosta =

Tang-e Chowgan-e Vosta تنگ چوگان وسطي
- Village
- Location within Iran
- Coordinates: 29°47′40″N 51°36′36″E
- Country: Iran
- Province: Fars
- County: Kazerun
- Bakhsh: Central
- Rural District: Shapur

Population (2006)
  - Total: 511
- Time zone: UTC+3:30 (IRST)
  - Summer (DST): UTC+4:30 (IRDT)

Tang-e Chowgan-e Vosta (Persian: تنگ چوگان وسطي, also Romanized as Tang-e Chowgān-e Vosţá; also known as Tang-e Chowgān-e Mīānī) is a village in Shapur Rural District, in the Central District of Kazerun County, Fars province, Iran. At the 2006 census, its population was 511, in 113 families.
