= Kanjeh =

Kanjeh (Persian: كنجه) may refer to:

- Kanjeh, Ardabil
- Kanjeh, Kohgiluyeh and Boyer-Ahmad
