= Tang-e Chowgan-e Sofla-ye Dar Shuri =

Tang-e Chowgan-e Sofla-ye Dar Shuri تنگ چوگان سفلي درشوري
- Village
- Location within Iran
- Coordinates: 29°47′13″N 51°35′37″E
- Country: Iran
- Province: Fars
- County: Kazerun
- Bakhsh: Central
- Rural District: Shapur

Population (2006)
  - Total: 249
- Time zone: UTC+3:30 (IRST)
  - Summer (DST): UTC+4:30 (IRDT)

Tang-e Chowgan-e Sofla-ye Dar Shuri (Persian: تنگ چوگان سفلي درشوري, also Romanized as Tang-e Chowgān-e 'Olyā-ye Dar Shūrī; also known as Tang-e Chowgān-e 'Olyā-ye Darreh Shūrī) is a village in Shapur Rural District, in the Central District of Kazerun County, Fars province, Iran. At the 2006 census, its population was 249, in 52 families.
