= Hakim Bashi-ye Hoseynabad =

Hakim Bashi-ye Hoseynabad حكيم باشي حسين اباد
- Village
- Location within Iran
- Coordinates: 29°45′44″N 51°32′35″E
- Country: Iran
- Province: Fars
- County: Kazerun
- Bakhsh: Chenar Shahijan
- Rural District: Anarestan

Population (2006)
  - Total: 723
- Time zone: UTC+3:30 (IRST)
  - Summer (DST): UTC+4:30 (IRDT)

Hakim Bashi-ye Hoseynabad (Persian: حكيم باشي حسين اباد, also Romanized as Ḩakīm Bāshī-ye Ḩoseynābād) is a village in Anarestan Rural District, Chenar Shahijan District, Kazerun County, Fars province, Iran. At the 2006 census, its population was 723, in 159 families.
