= Tang-e Chowgan-e Sofla =

Tang-e Chowgan-e Sofla تنگ چوگان سفلي
- Village
- Location within Iran
- Coordinates: 29°46′56″N 51°35′42″E
- Country: Iran
- Province: Fars
- County: Kazerun
- Bakhsh: Central
- Rural District: Shapur

Population (2006)
  - Total: 191
- Time zone: UTC+3:30 (IRST)
  - Summer (DST): UTC+4:30 (IRDT)

Tang-e Chowgan-e Sofla (Persian: تنگ چوگان سفلي, also Romanized as Tang-e Chowgān-e Soflá, and Tang-e Chowgān Soflá; also known as Tang-e Chowgān-e Pā’īn) is a village in Shapur Rural District, in the Central District of Kazerun County, Fars province, Iran. At the 2006 census, its population was 191, in 41 families.
