= Shah Galdi =

Shah Galdi (Persian: شاه گلدي) may refer to:

- Shah Galdi, Fars
- Shah Galdi, Razavi Khorasan
