= Tang-e Chowgan-e Olya-ye Kashkuli =

Tang-e Chowgan-e Olya-ye Kashkuli تنگ چوگان علياكشكولي
- Village
- Location within Iran
- Coordinates: 29°47′55″N 51°37′07″E
- Country: Iran
- Province: Fars
- County: Kazerun
- Bakhsh: Central
- Rural District: Shapur

Population (2006)
  - Total: 326
- Time zone: UTC+3:30 (IRST)
  - Summer (DST): UTC+4:30 (IRDT)

Tang-e Chowgan-e Olya-ye Kashkuli (Persian: تنگ چوگان علياكشكولي, also Romanized as Tang-e Chowgān-e 'Olyā-ye Kashkūlī) is a village in Shapur Rural District, in the Central District of Kazerun County, Fars province, Iran. At the 2006 census, its population was 326, in 79 families.
