= Elyasabad, Kazerun =

Elyasabad الياس اباد
- Village
- Location within Iran
- Coordinates: 29°50′00″N 51°34′57″E
- Country: Iran
- Province: Fars
- County: Kazerun
- Bakhsh: Chenar Shahijan
- Rural District: Somghan

Population (2006)
  - Total: 409
- Time zone: UTC+3:30 (IRST)
  - Summer (DST): UTC+4:30 (IRDT)

Elyasabad (Persian: الياس اباد, also Romanized as Elyāsābād) is a village in Somghan Rural District, Chenar Shahijan District, Kazerun County, Fars province, Iran. At the 2006 census, its population was 409, in 87 families.
