= Borj Sukhteh-ye Sofla =

Borj Sukhteh-ye Sofla برج سوخته سفلي
- Village
- Location within Iran
- Coordinates: 29°44′14″N 51°33′21″E
- Country: Iran
- Province: Fars
- County: Kazerun
- Bakhsh: Chenar Shahijan
- Rural District: Anarestan

Population (2006)
  - Total: 115
- Time zone: UTC+3:30 (IRST)
  - Summer (DST): UTC+4:30 (IRDT)

Borj Sukhteh-ye Sofla (Persian: برج سوخته سفلي, also Romanized as Borj Sūkhteh-ye Soflá and called Boneh Seyyed Naşrollāh or Boneh-ye Seyyed Naşrollāh) is a village in Anarestan Rural District, Chenar Shahijan District, Kazerun County, Fars province, Iran. At the 2006 census, its population was 115, in 22 families.
