= Seyyed Hoseyn, Kazerun =

Village in Fars province, Iran

Seyyed Hoseyn Persian: سيدحسين
- Village
- Location within Iran
- Coordinates: 29°48′06″N 51°34′12″E
- Country: Iran
- Province: Fars
- County: Kazerun
- District: Central
- Rural District: Shapur

Population (2016)
  - Total: 1,225
- Time zone: UTC+3:30 (IRST)

Seyyed Hoseyn (Persian: سيدحسين) (Note: Also romanized as Seyyed Ḩoseyn; also known as Deh-e Seyyed Ḩoseyn) is a village in, and the capital of, Shapur Rural District of the Central District of Kazerun County, Fars province, Iran. The previous capital of the rural district was the village of Anarestan.

== Demographics ==
=== Population ===
At the time of the 2006 National Census, the village's population was 1,446 in 283 households. The following census in 2011 counted 1,023 people in 269 households. The 2016 census measured the population of the village as 1,225 people in 371 households. It was the most populous village in its rural district.
