= Mehrenjan, Kazerun =

Village in Fars province, Iran

Mehrenjan Persian: مهرنجان
- Village
- Location within Iran
- Coordinates: 29°33′35″N 51°39′55″E
- Country: Iran
- Province: Fars
- County: Kazerun
- District: Central
- Rural District: Balyan

Population (2016)
  - Total: 3,598
- Time zone: UTC+3:30 (IRST)

Mehrenjan (Persian: مهرنجان) (Note: Also romanized as Mehranjān and Mehrenjān) is a village in, and the capital of, Balyan Rural District of the Central District of Kazerun County, Fars province, Iran.

== Demographics ==
=== Population ===
At the time of the 2006 National Census, the village's population was 3,410 in 707 households. The following census in 2011 counted 3,550 people in 874 households. The 2016 census measured the population of the village as 3,598 people in 970 households. It was the most populous village in its rural district.
