= Borj Sukhteh-ye Olya =

Borj Sukhteh-ye Olya برج سوخته عليا
- Village
- Location within Iran
- Coordinates: 29°44′23″N 51°33′24″E
- Country: Iran
- Province: Fars
- County: Kazerun
- Bakhsh: Chenar Shahijan
- Rural District: Anarestan

Population (2006)
  - Total: 74
- Time zone: UTC+3:30 (IRST)
  - Summer (DST): UTC+4:30 (IRDT)

Borj Sukhteh-ye Olya (Persian: برج سوخته عليا, also Romanized as Borj Sūkhteh-ye 'Olyā; also known as Borj Sūkhteh and Borj Sūkhteh-ye Bālā) is a village in Anarestan Rural District, Chenar Shahijan District, Kazerun County, Fars province, Iran. At the 2006 census, its population was 74, in 15 families.
