= Tang-e Zard, Fars =

Tang-e Zard تنگ زرد
- Village
- Location within Iran
- Coordinates: 29°32′15″N 51°54′30″E
- Country: Iran
- Province: Fars
- County: Kazerun
- Bakhsh: Kuhmareh
- Rural District: Dasht-e Barm

Population (2006)
  - Total: 28
- Time zone: UTC+3:30 (IRST)
  - Summer (DST): UTC+4:30 (IRDT)

Tang-e Zard (Persian: تنگ زرد) is a village in Dasht-e Barm Rural District, Kuhmareh District, Kazerun County, Fars province, Iran. At the 2006 census, its population was 28, in 4 families.
