= Varak =

'Varak (Persian: وارک or ورک, Sanskrit: वरक) may refer to:

- Varak, Fars (وارک - Vārak)
- Varak, Lorestan (وارک - Vārak)
- Varak, Qazvin (ورک - Varak)
- Vark, varak or varaka (वरक), a foil composed of a pure metal (typically silver, but gold is also used) which is used for garnishing sweets in South Asian cuisine.
- Varak, Armenian (Վարագ - Varak) popular Western Armenian name for Armenian males and a mountainside on which a piece of the wooden cross of the crucifixion of the Lord and Savior of mankind Jesus Christ is found, as well as an Armenian school, church and monastery were built. (Burned to the ground, including precious ancient Christian and pre-Christian manuscripts, by impune, maniacal Turks in 1915, during the Armenian Genocide).
