= Kheyratabad-e Barkatak =

Village in Fars province, Iran

Kheyratabad-e Barkatak Persian: خيرات ابادبركتك
- Village
- Location within Iran
- Coordinates: 29°39′03″N 51°36′40″E
- Country: Iran
- Province: Fars
- County: Kazerun
- District: Central
- Rural District: Deris

Population (2016)
  - Total: 2,517
- Time zone: UTC+3:30 (IRST)

Kheyratabad-e Barkatak (Persian: خيرات ابادبركتك) (Note: Also romanized as Kheyratābād-e Barkatak; also known as Kheyratābād-e Bazkatak) is a village in Deris Rural District (Note: Formerly Chugan Rural District) of the Central District of Kazerun County, Fars province, Iran.

== Demographics ==
=== Population ===
According to the 2006 National Census, the village had a population of 1,518 across 330 households. In the 2011 census, the population increased to 1,614 people in 375 households. By the 2016 census, the population had grown significantly to 2,517 people in 477 households, making it the most populous village in its rural district.
