= Ganjehi =

Ganjehi گنجه اي
- Village
- Location within Iran
- Coordinates: 29°48′45″N 51°34′07″E
- Country: Iran
- Province: Fars
- County: Kazerun
- Bakhsh: Chenar Shahijan
- Rural District: Anarestan

Population (2006)
  - Total: 659
- Time zone: UTC+3:30 (IRST)
  - Summer (DST): UTC+4:30 (IRDT)

Ganjehi (Persian: گنجه اي, also Romanized as Ganjeh’ī; also known as Ganjeh) is a village in Anarestan Rural District, Chenar Shahijan District, Kazerun County, Fars province, Iran. At the 2006 census, its population was 659, in 170 families.
