= Ayazabad, Fars =

Ayazabad ايازاباد
- Village
- Location within Iran
- Coordinates: 29°32′59″N 51°45′24″E
- Country: Iran
- Province: Fars
- County: Kazerun
- Bakhsh: Central
- Rural District: Balyan

Population (2006)
  - Total: 254
- Time zone: UTC+3:30 (IRST)
  - Summer (DST): UTC+4:30 (IRDT)

Ayazabad (Persian: ايازاباد, also Romanized as Ayāzābād) is a village in Balyan Rural District, in the Central District of Kazerun County, Fars province, Iran. At the 2006 census, its population was 254, in 51 families.
