= Pir-e Sabz, Fars =

Pir-e Sabz پيرسبز
- Village
- Location within Iran
- Coordinates: 29°48′21″N 51°38′28″E
- Country: Iran
- Province: Fars
- County: Kazerun
- Bakhsh: Chenar Shahijan
- Rural District: Somghan

Population (2006)
  - Total: 563
- Time zone: UTC+3:30 (IRST)
  - Summer (DST): UTC+4:30 (IRDT)

Pir-e Sabz (Persian: پيرسبز, also Romanized as Pīr-e Sabz and Pīr Sabz) is a village in Somghan Rural District, Chenar Shahijan District, Kazerun County, Fars province, Iran. At the 2006 census, its population was 563, in 125 families.
