= Mardos =

Mardos (Μάρδος) may refer to:

- Bardiya, a king of Persia
- Amardus, a river of ancient Media
- Moardăș, a village now in Romania
