= Hajjiabad-e Olya =

Hajjiabad-e Olya or Haji Abad Olya or Hajiabad Olya (Persian: حاجي ابادعليا) may refer to:

- Hajjiabad-e Olya, Fars
- Hajjiabad-e Olya, Hamadan
- Hajjiabad-e Olya, Lorestan
