= Papun-e Olya =

Papun-e Olya پاپون عليا
- Village
- Location within Iran
- Coordinates: 29°45′42″N 51°44′24″E
- Country: Iran
- Province: Fars
- County: Kazerun
- Bakhsh: Kuhmareh
- Rural District: Kuhmareh

Population (2006)
  - Total: 461
- Time zone: UTC+3:30 (IRST)
  - Summer (DST): UTC+4:30 (IRDT)

Papun-e Olya (Persian: پاپون عليا, also Romanized as Pāpūn-e 'Olyā; also known as Pāpūn, Pāpūnī, and Pāpūnī Moḩammad) is a village in Kuhmareh Rural District, Kuhmareh District, Kazerun County, Fars province, Iran. At the 2006 census, its population was 461, in 94 families.
