= Papun-e Sofla =

Papun-e Sofla پاپون سفلي
- Village
- Location within Iran
- Coordinates: 29°45′26″N 51°42′46″E
- Country: Iran
- Province: Fars
- County: Kazerun
- Bakhsh: Kuhmareh
- Rural District: Kuhmareh

Population (2006)
  - Total: 564
- Time zone: UTC+3:30 (IRST)
  - Summer (DST): UTC+4:30 (IRDT)

Papun-e Sofla (Persian: پاپون سفلي, also Romanized as Pāpūn-e Soflá) is a village in Kuhmareh Rural District, Kuhmareh District, Kazerun County, Fars province, Iran. At the 2006 census, its population was 564, in 116 families.
