= Hajjiabad-e Ghuri =

Hajjiabad-e Ghuri حاجي ابادغوري
- Village
- Location within Iran
- Coordinates: 29°49′34″N 51°33′42″E
- Country: Iran
- Province: Fars
- County: Kazerun
- Bakhsh: Chenar Shahijan
- Rural District: Anarestan

Population (2006)
  - Total: 1,248
- Time zone: UTC+3:30 (IRST)
  - Summer (DST): UTC+4:30 (IRDT)

Hajjiabad-e Ghuri (Persian: حاجي ابادغوري, also Romanized as Ḩājjīābād-e Ghūrī; also known as Ḩājīābād 'Olyā, Ḩājjīābād, and Ḩājjīābād-e Bālā) is a village in Anarestan Rural District, Chenar Shahijan District, Kazerun County, Fars province, Iran. At the 2006 census, its population was 1,248, in 280 families.
