= Parak, Fars =

Parak پرك
- Village
- Location within Iran
- Coordinates: 29°31′35″N 51°55′47″E
- Country: Iran
- Province: Fars
- County: Kazerun
- Bakhsh: Kuhmareh
- Rural District: Dasht-e Barm

Population (2006)
  - Total: 109
- Time zone: UTC+3:30 (IRST)
  - Summer (DST): UTC+4:30 (IRDT)

Parak (Persian: پرك; also known as Parakī) is a village in Dasht-e Barm Rural District, Kuhmareh District, Kazerun County, Fars province, Iran. At the 2006 census, its population was 109, in 20 families.
