= Deris =

Village in Fars province, Iran

Deris Persian: دريس
- Village
- Location within Iran
- Coordinates: 29°41′07″N 51°34′42″E
- Country: Iran
- Province: Fars
- County: Kazerun
- District: Central
- Rural District: Deris

Population (2016)
  - Total: 1,892
- Time zone: UTC+3:30 (IRST)

Deris (Persian: دريس) (Note: Also romanized as Derīs; also known as Pīr Derīz and Pīr-i-Dīriz) is a village in, and the capital of, Deris Rural District (Note: Formerly Chugan Rural District) of the Central District of Kazerun County, Fars province, Iran.

== Demographics ==
=== Population ===
At the time of the 2006 National Census, the village's population was 1,667 in 414 households. The following census in 2011 counted 1,784 people in 484 households. The 2016 census measured the population of the village as 1,892 people in 536 households.
