= Amardi =

Ancient Iranian tribe

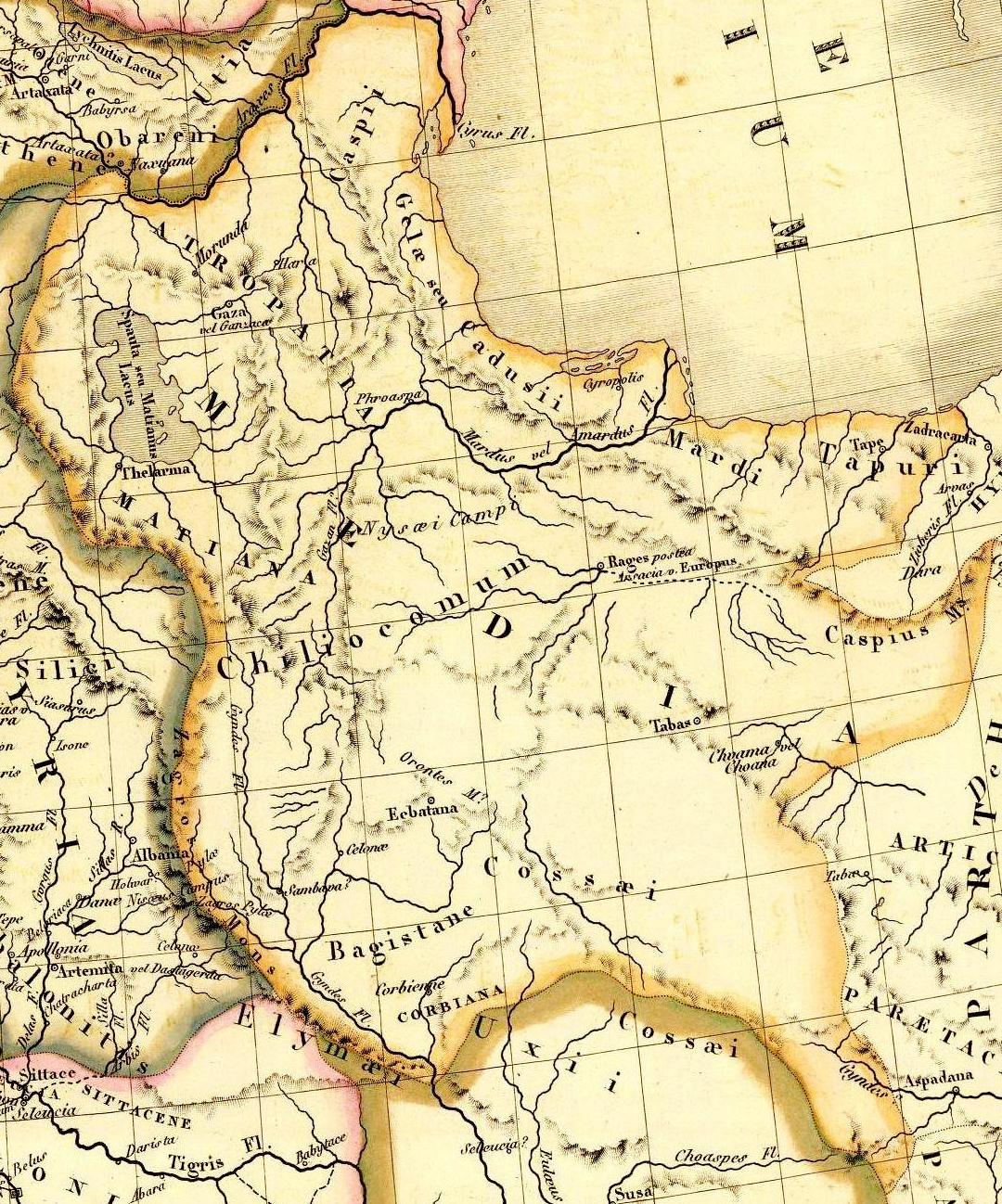
A map that shows the area of the Amards between the Sefid-Rud and Do Hezar River.

The Amardians, widely referred to as the Amardi (and sometimes Mardi), were an ancient Iranian tribe living along the mountainous region bordering the Caspian Sea to the north, to whom the Iron Age culture at Marlik is attributed. They are said to be related to, or the same tribe as, the Dahae and Sacae. That is to say, they were Scythian. Herodotus mentions a tribe with a similar name as one of the ten to fifteen Persian tribes in Persis.

They lived in the valleys in between the Susis and Persis, in what is now southwestern Iran. The southern Mardi are described by Nearchus as one of the four predatory mountain peoples of the southwest, along with the Susians, Uxii, and Elymaeans. Of these four nomadic groups, they were the only tribe linguistically Iranian.

== Etymology ==
The term Mardi comes from the Old Iranian word for "man" (Old Persian: 𐎶𐎼𐎫𐎡𐎹 martiya; from Proto-Indo-European *mr̥tós, "mortal").

Richard N. Frye believe that the name of the city of Amol is rooted in the word Amard, which occurs as Amui in Middle Persian. According to historical literature, Amol was the capital of Tapuria (modern-day Mazanderan), at least in the period starting from the Sasanian Empire to the Ilkhanate of the Mongol Empire.

== Historical accounts ==
Strabo mentions the name Mardi several times. He places their location to the south of the Caspian Sea in what is now Gilan and Mazanderan, in northern Iran. On his map, he mentions Amardos (and the Amardos river), the name attributed to the region of Sefidrud at the time.

Herodotus mentions a tribe with a similar name as one of the ten to fifteen Persian tribes in Persis. They lived in the valleys in between the Susis and Persis, in what is now southwestern Iran. The southern Mardi are described by Nearchus as one of the four predatory mountain peoples of the southwest, along with the Susians, Uxii, and Elymaeans. Of these four nomadic groups, they were the only tribe linguistically Iranian.

== Gallery ==
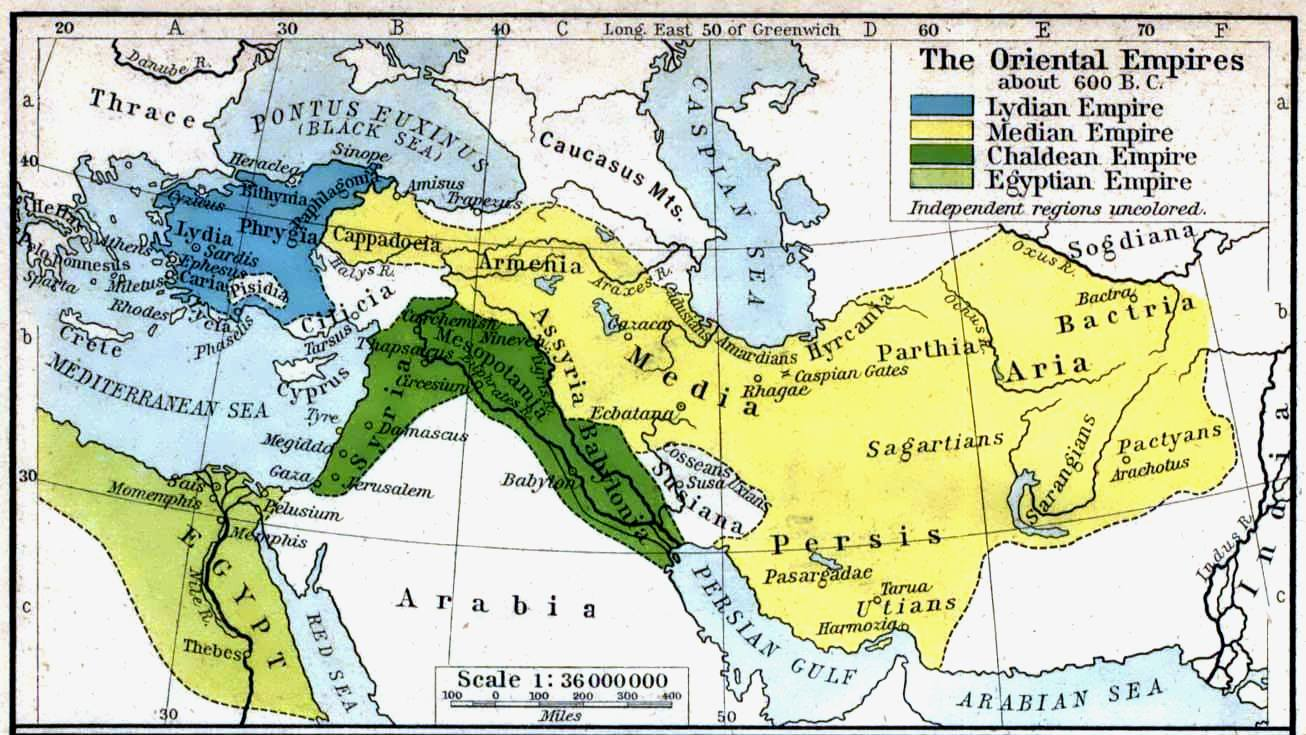
Map of the Median Empire (600 BC), showing the relative locations of the Amardian tribe.

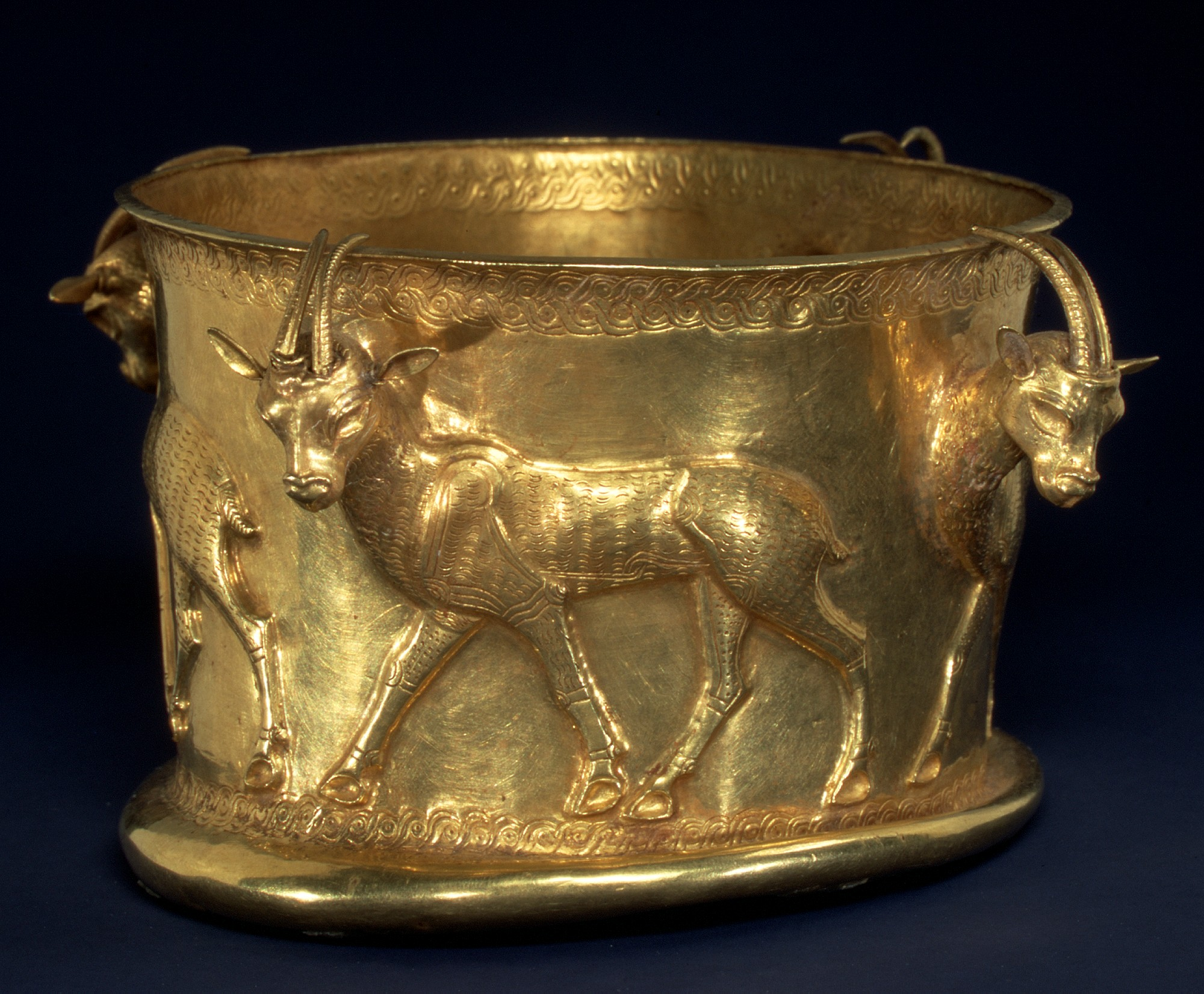
Iron Age gold cup from Marlik, kept at the Metropolitan Museum of Art, New York City.

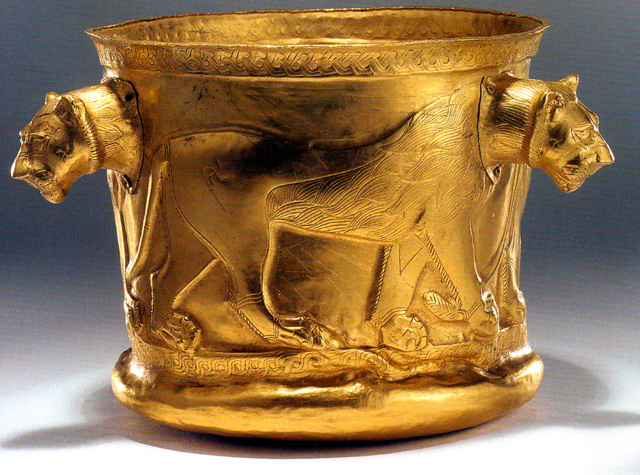
The Hyrcanian Golden cup. Dated first half of first millennium. Excavated at Kelardasht, Mazandaran.

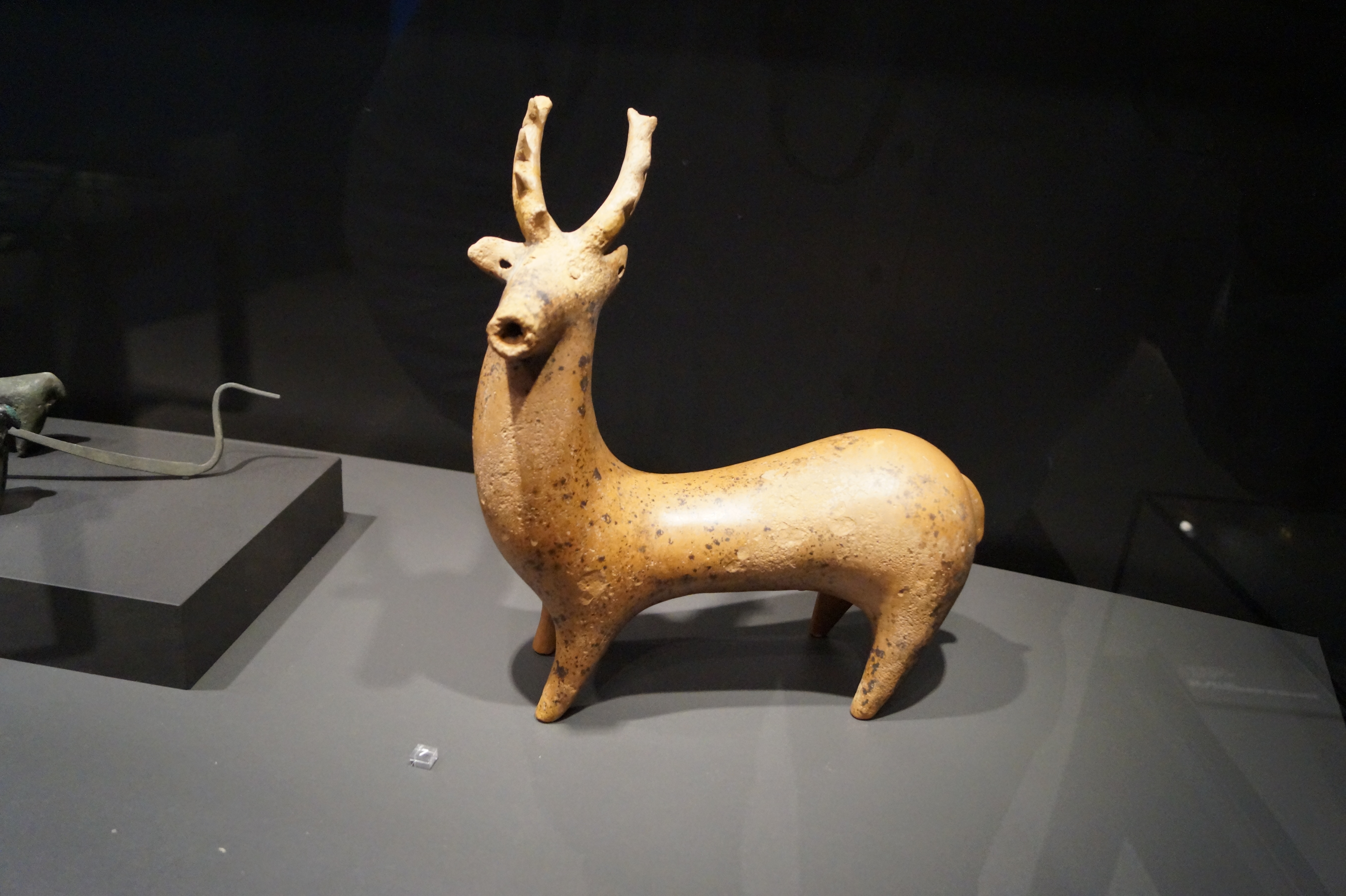
Deer stag Marlik

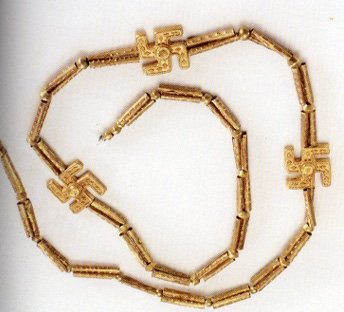
Golden necklace of three Swastikas from Marlik, kept at the National Museum, Tehran.

== See also ==
- Phraates I
- Mardaites
