= Abu ol Hayat Rural District =

Rural district in Fars province, Iran

Abu ol Hayat Rural District Persian: دهستان ابوالحیات
- Rural District
- Location within Iran
- Coordinates: 29°43′44″N 51°48′41″E
- Country: Iran
- Province: Fars
- County: Kuhchenar
- District: Kuhmareh
- Capital: Dikanak
- Time zone: UTC+3:30 (IRST)

Abu ol Hayat Rural District (Persian: دهستان ابوالحیات) is in Kuhmareh District of Kuhchenar County, Fars province, Iran. Its capital is the village of Dikanak, whose population at the time of the 2016 National Census was 1,134 in 321 households.

== History ==
Abu ol Hayat Rural District was created in Kuhmareh District in 2018.
