= Marlik =

Archaeological site in Iran

Cheraghali Tappeh چراغعلی تپه/تپه مارلیک
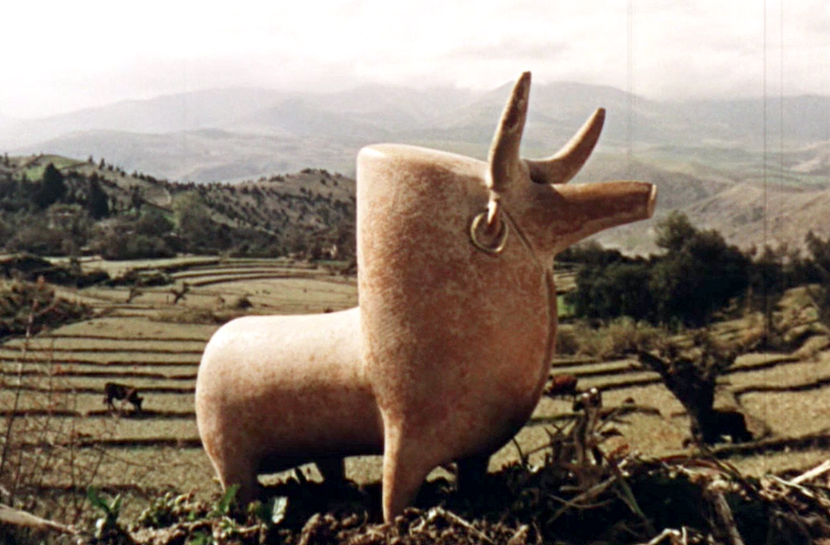

- Location within Iran
- 36°49′50″N 49°27′33″E
- Location: Nesfi, Rudbar, Gilan, Iran

Iran National Heritage List
- Official name: Marlik Mound/Cheraghali Tappeh
- Type: Mound
- Designated: 1963
- Reference no.: 419
- Conservation organization: Cultural Heritage, Handicrafts and Tourism Organization of Iran

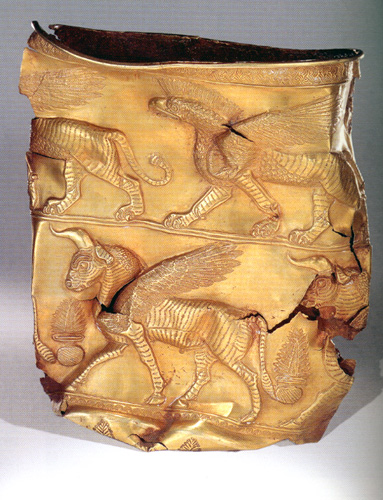
Golden Cup depicting Griffin-like figures and winged bulls. Excavated at Marlik, Gilan, Iran. First half of first millennium BC.

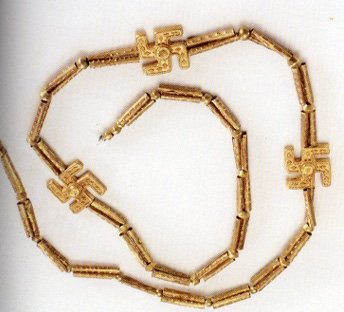
Golden necklace of three Swastikas found in Marlik, dates back to first millennium B.C.

Marlik is an ancient site near Roudbar in Gilan, in northern Iran. Marlik, also known as Cheragh-Ali Tepe is located in the valley of Gohar Rud, a tributary of Sepid Rud in Gilan Province in Northern Iran, Marlik. Marlik is the site of a royal cemetery containing 53 graves, and artifacts found at this site date back to primarily to the Iron Age. Some of the artifacts contain amazing workmanship with gold. Marlik is named after the Amard people.

== Marlik Cup ==
Marlik Cup is a cup of pure gold and is 18 cm high. The height of the prominent designs of the cup reaches 2 cm.

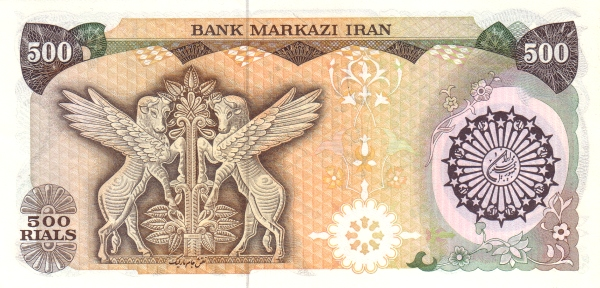
Pattern of the Marlik Cup on the five hundred rial banknotes of the Pahlavi era.

== Archaeology ==
The mound at Mārlik is a rocky outcrop capped by several meters of sediment. It is surrounded by olive groves and fruit gardens owned and maintained by local villagers, overlooking rice paddies on the lower slopes of the valley. The site was already partly looted by treasure hunters and the archaeology teams were hindered by local corruption

A number of tombs were found. The initial Archaeology report concluded: "In total, fifty-three tombs were discovered at Mārlik. The tombs were dug into the overlaying sediments of the mound, sometimes hitting and penetrating into the underlying bedrock. The tomb constructions vary from roughly dug pits lined with stone to fairly well-constructed examples with walls made from stone slabs bound together with mud mortar. The stone used in the tombs is mostly local, but in some tombs one could see yellowish slabs brought from the headwaters of the Gowharrud, some 15 km to the south. A few, evidently more important, tombs are entirely made of this imported stone, a potential indication of the social significance of the occupant. The tombs range in size from fairly small (1.5x1x1 m [Tomb 4]) to relatively large (7x4.5x2.5 m [Tomb 52]). Most tombs yielded very little or no large skeletal remains, perhaps a result of natural deterioration of organic material and rodent activity. In the handful of tombs, where partial skeletal remains were preserved, the body seemed to have been laid on its side on a large, flattened slab, surrounded by grave goods."

The archaeology is generally assumed to have belonged to a people group who spoke an Iranian language and who migrated into Iran from Central Asia in the early to mid-2nd millennium BCE. The abundance of arms, horse-trappings (as well as horse burials), and spouted vessels among the grave goods has been cited as distinct Iranian signatures (Kurochkin). The exact attribution of these people, however, remains largely a conjecture.

== See also ==
- Amardi

== Gallery ==
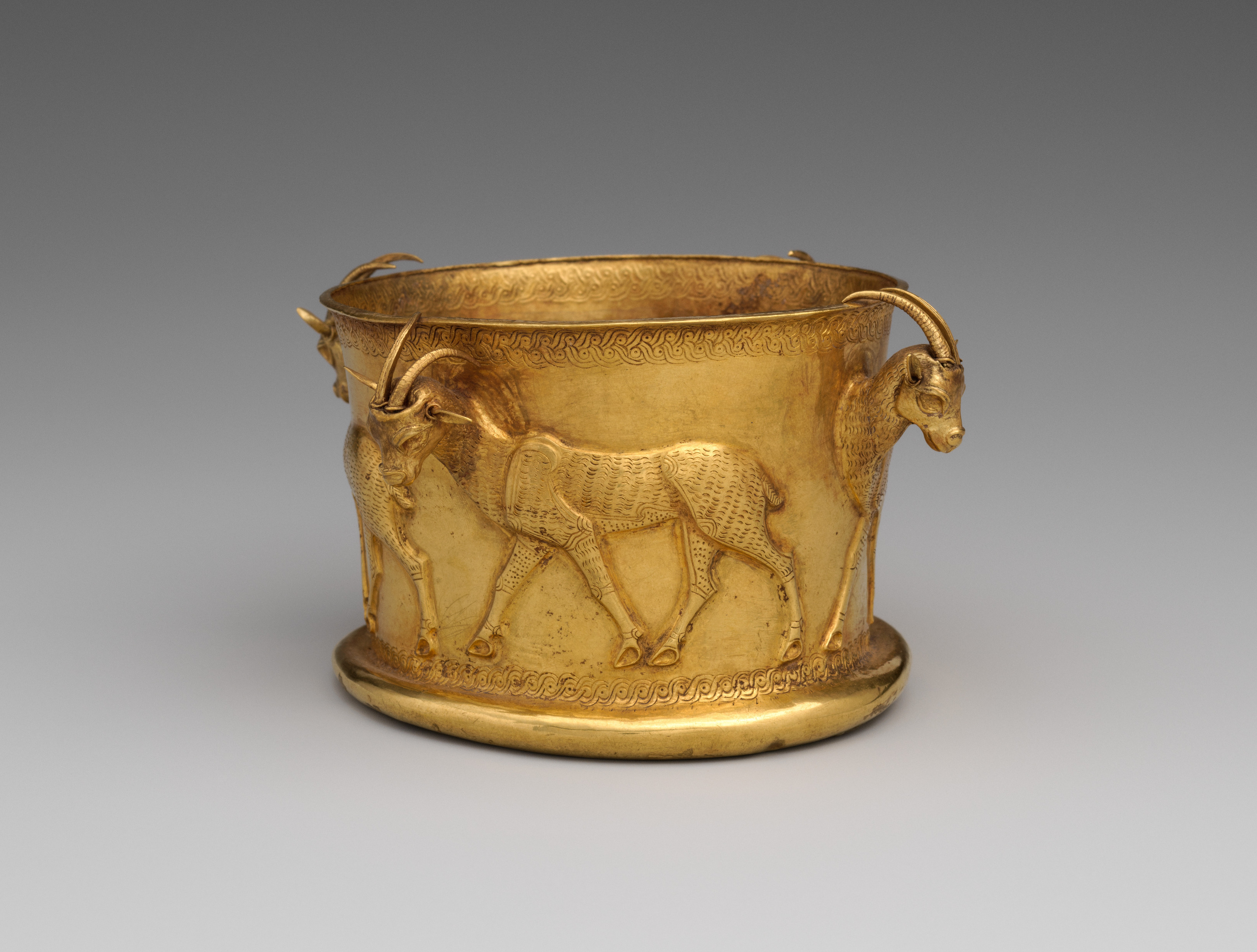
Gold cup with a frieze of gazelles, ca. early 1st millennium BCE, Metropolitan Museum of Art

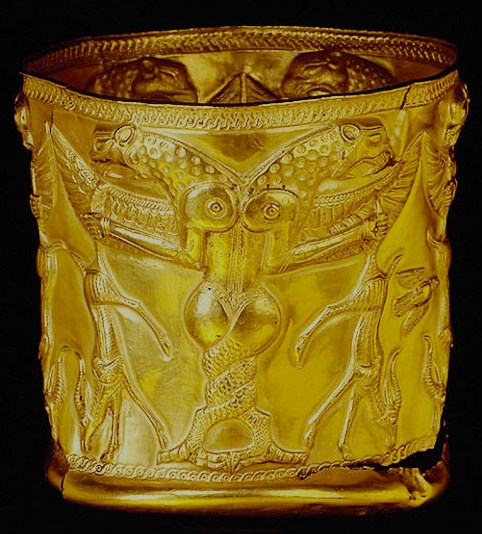
Double-headed eagle cup, Louvre

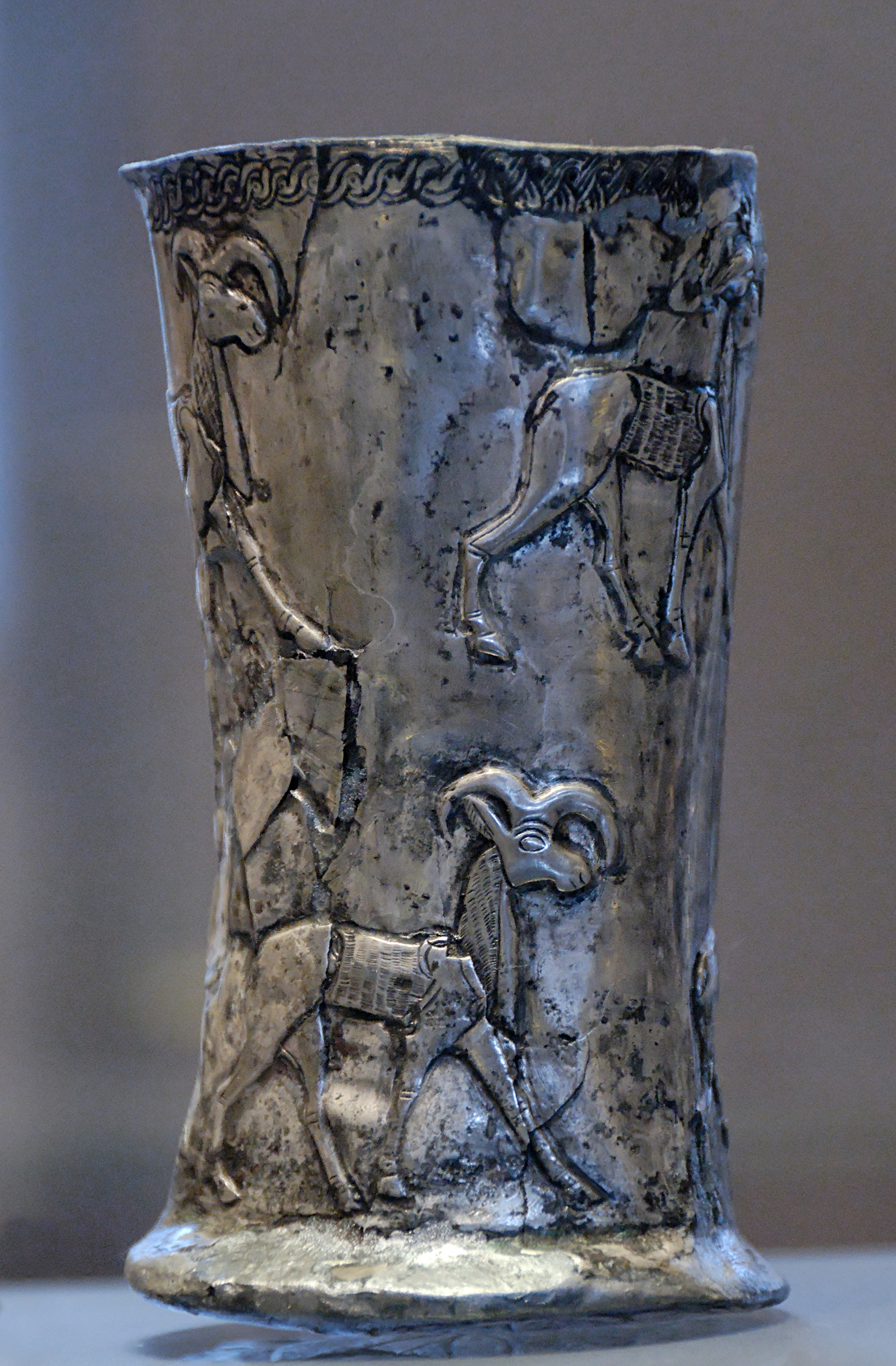
Silver cup with a decorative edge of a sheep, 14th to 11th century BC. Place of discovery of Marlik Hill Cemetery, Louvre

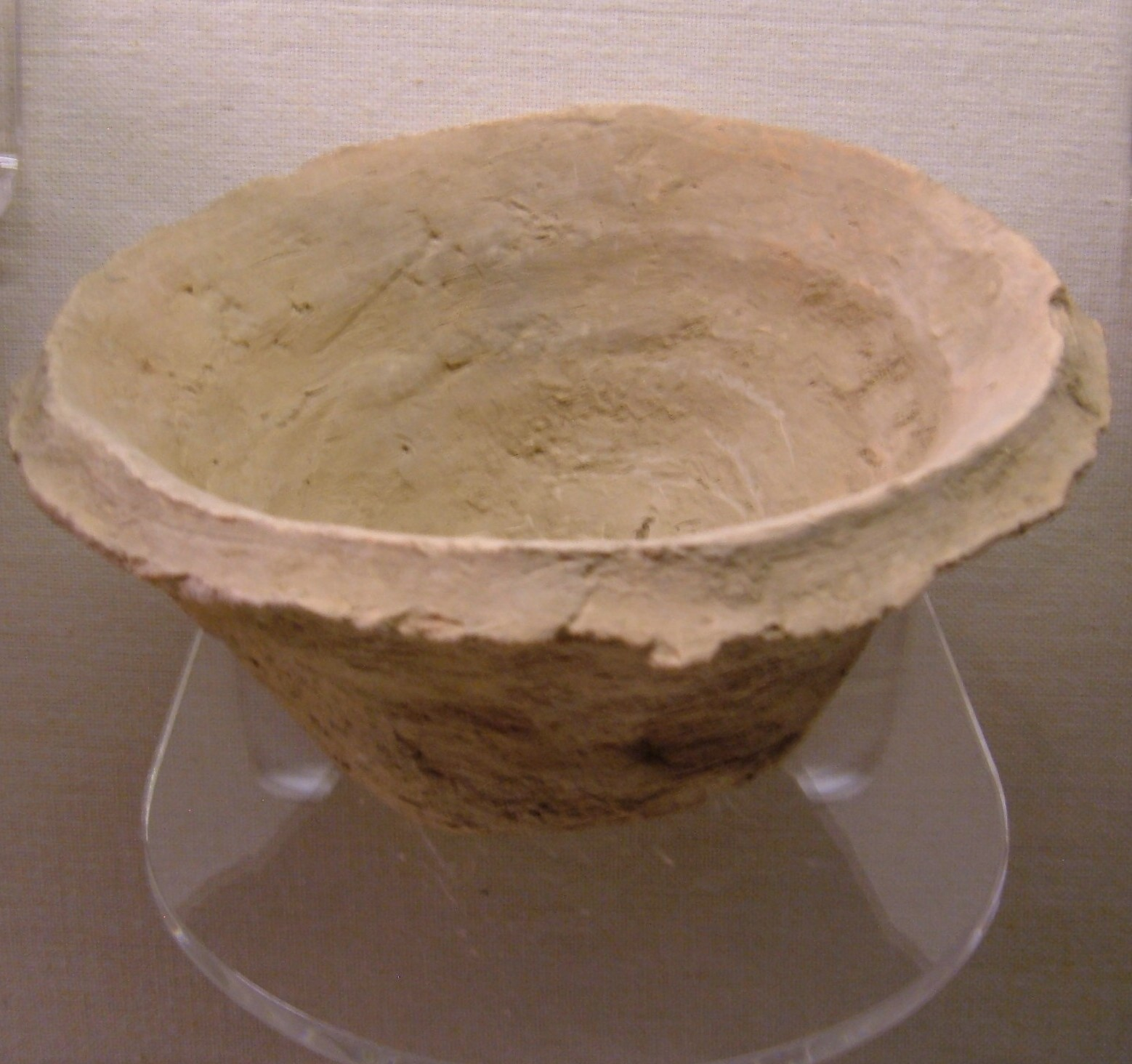
A clay bowl discovered on Marlik Hill, Egyptian Rosicrucian Museum, San Jose, California. This type of bowl could contain the ration of a day laborer who was forced to work.

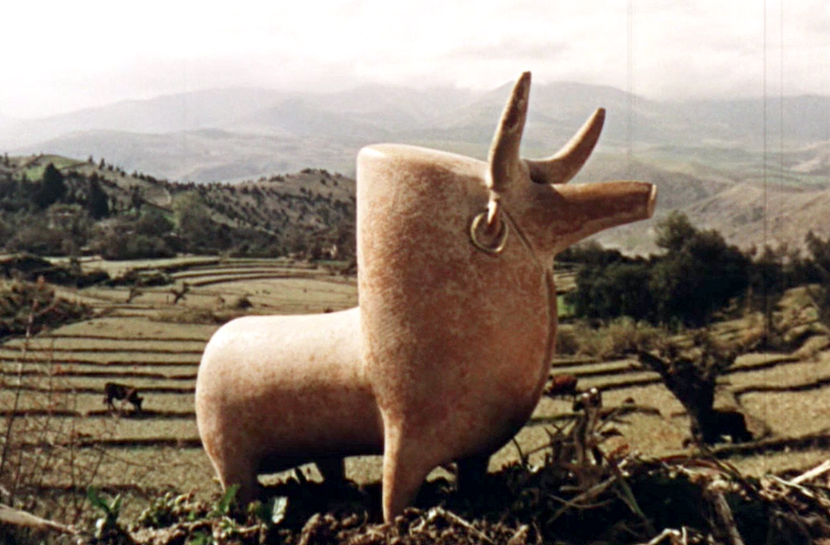
Cow-shaped earthenware

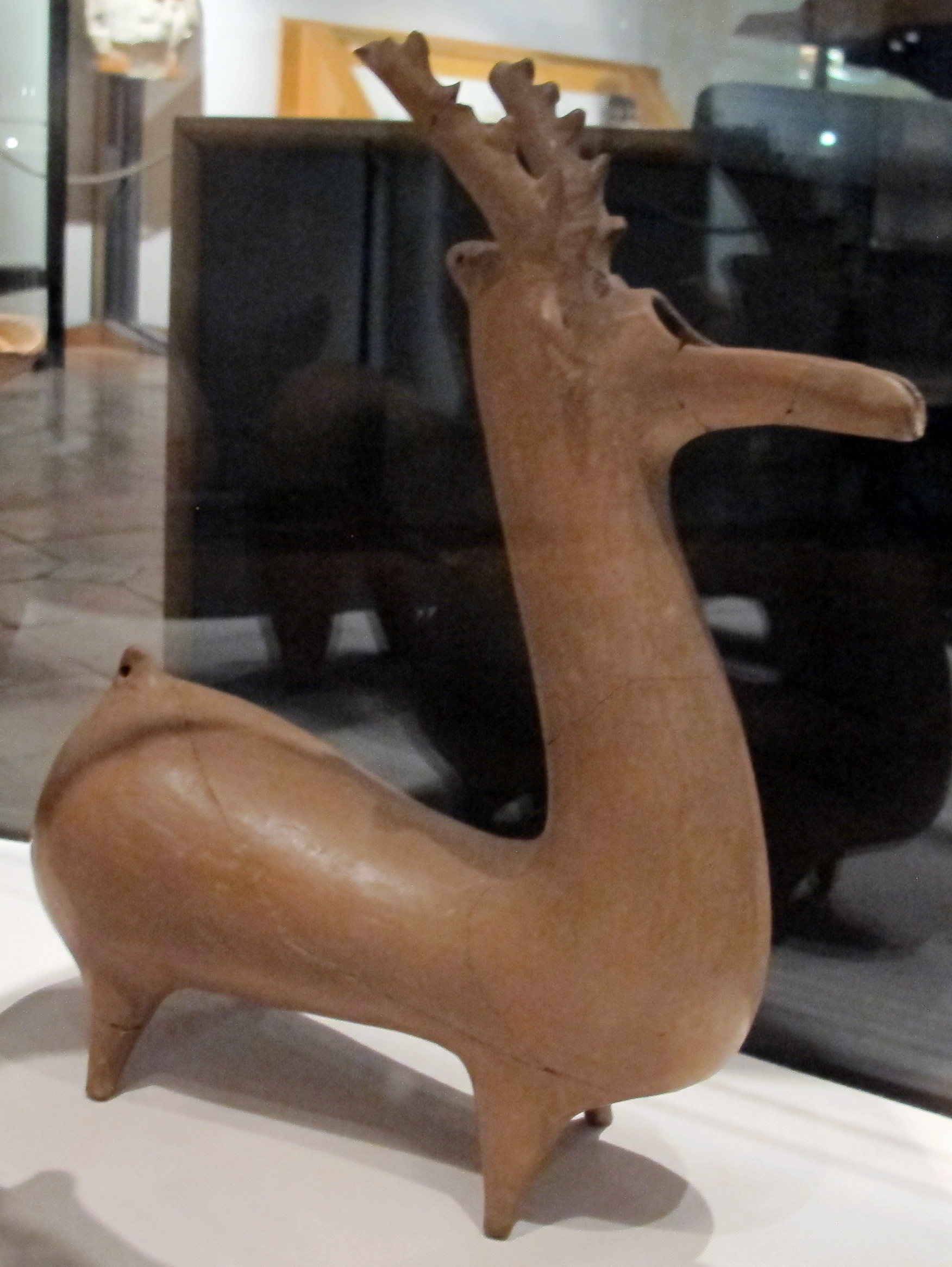
Animal vase, National Museum of Oriental Art, Rome

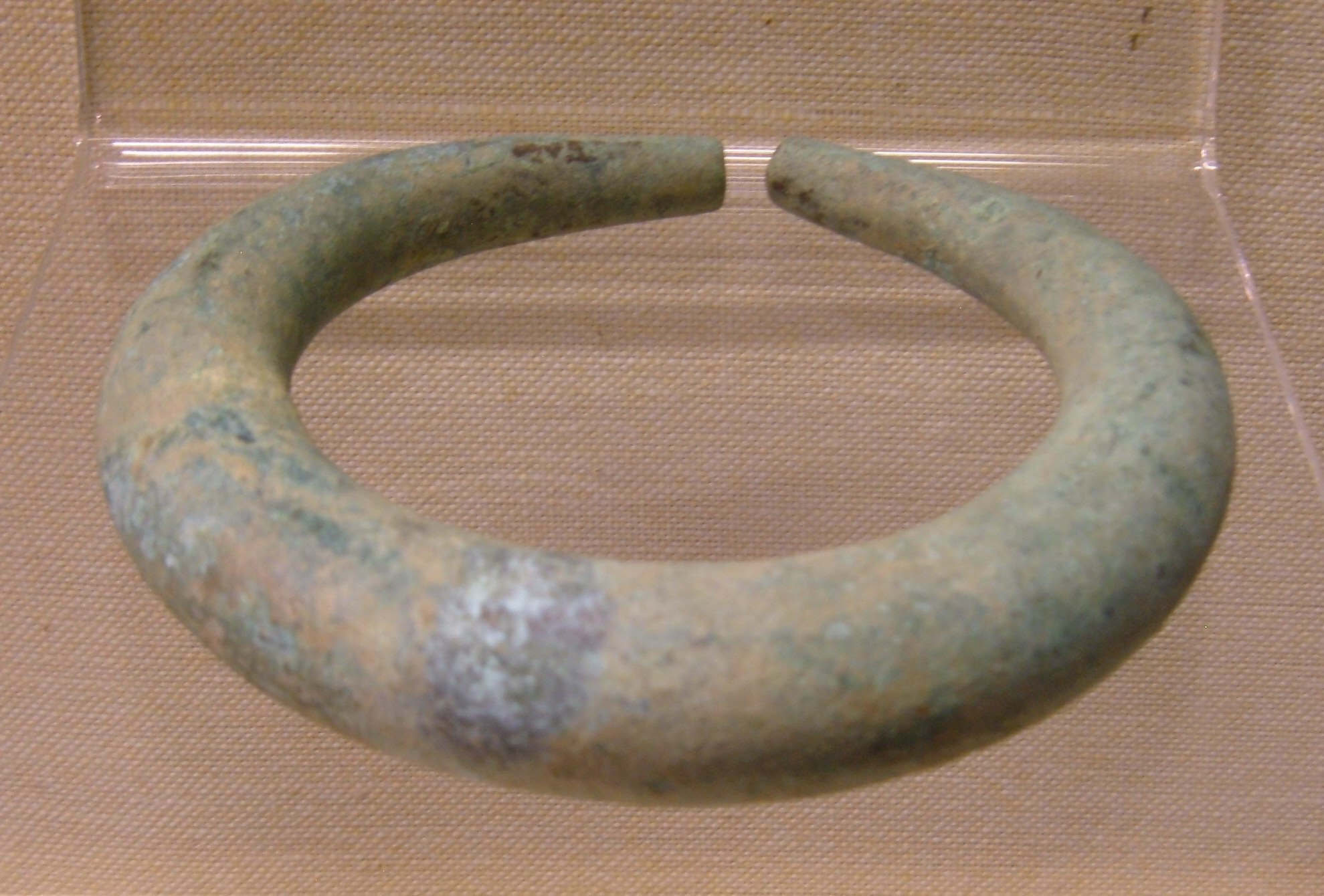
Bronze Bracelet,

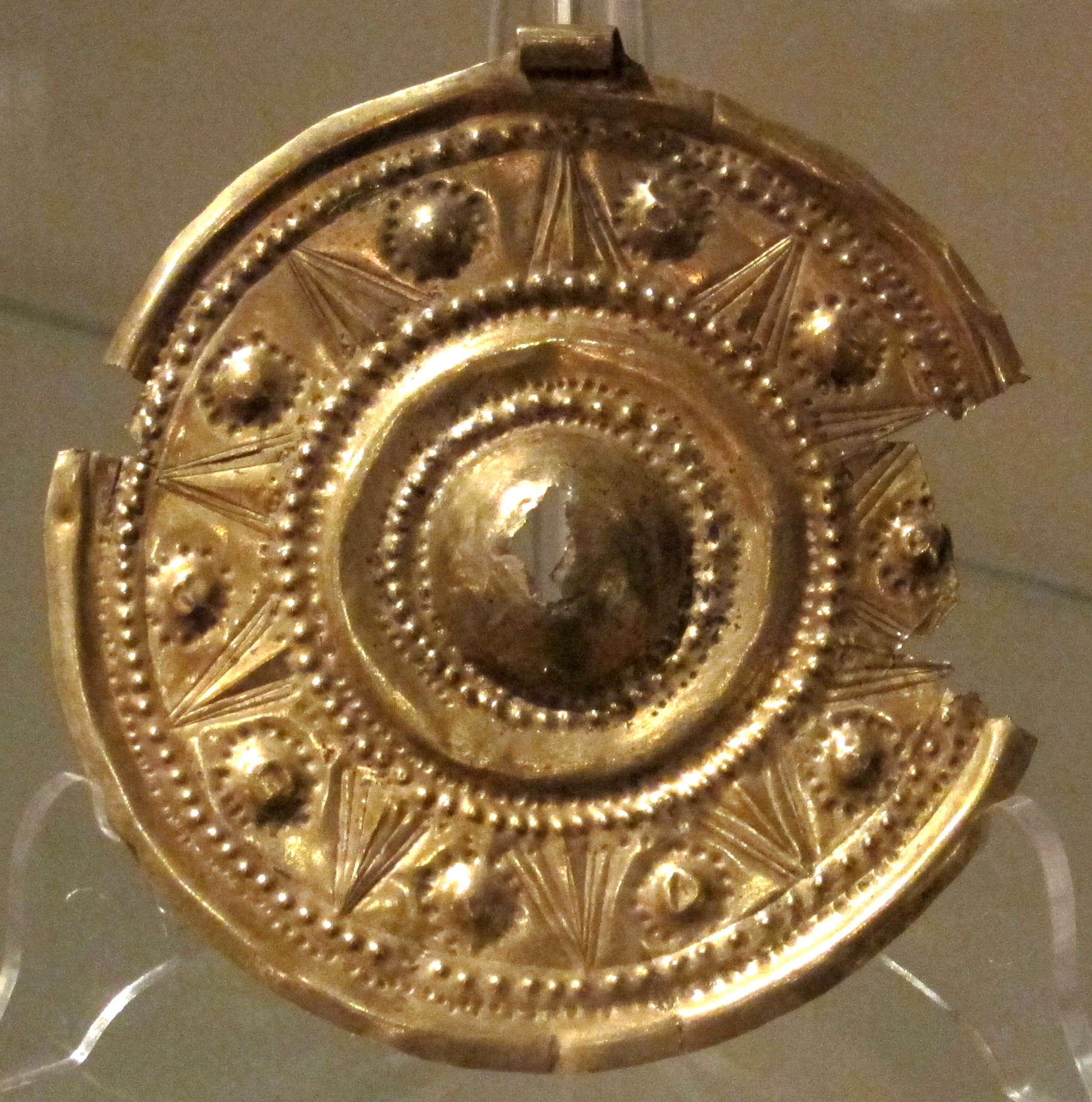
Disc-like necklace, National Museum of Oriental Art, Rome
