= Parak, Lali =

Parak پاراك
- Village
- Location within Iran
- Coordinates: 32°31′11″N 49°11′30″E
- Country: Iran
- Province: Khuzestan
- County: Lali
- Bakhsh: Hati
- Rural District: Hati

Population (2006)
  - Total: 31
- Time zone: UTC+3:30 (IRST)
  - Summer (DST): UTC+4:30 (IRDT)

Parak (Persian: پاراك, also Romanized as Pārāk) is a village in Hati Rural District, Hati District, Lali County, Khuzestan Province, Iran. At the 2006 census, its population was 31, in 4 families.
