= Pir Sabz, Kohgiluyeh and Boyer-Ahmad =

Pir Sabz پيرسبز
- Village
- Location within Iran
- Coordinates: 30°22′55″N 50°56′04″E
- Country: Iran
- Province: Kohgiluyeh and Boyer-Ahmad
- County: Gachsaran
- Bakhsh: Central
- Rural District: Emamzadeh Jafar

Population (2006)
  - Total: 24
- Time zone: UTC+3:30 (IRST)
  - Summer (DST): UTC+4:30 (IRDT)

Pir Sabz (Persian: پيرسبز, also Romanized as Pīr Sabz) is a village in Emamzadeh Jafar Rural District, in the Central District of Gachsaran County, Kohgiluyeh and Boyer-Ahmad Province, Iran. At the 2006 census, its population was 24, in 7 families.
