= Elyasabad, West Azerbaijan =

Elyasabad الياس اباد
- Village
- Location within Iran
- Coordinates: 37°35′02″N 45°09′29″E
- Country: Iran
- Province: West Azerbaijan
- County: Urmia
- Bakhsh: Central
- Rural District: Bakeshluchay

Population (2006)
  - Total: 741
- Time zone: UTC+3:30 (IRST)
  - Summer (DST): UTC+4:30 (IRDT)

Elyasabad (Persian: الياس اباد, also Romanized as Elyāsābād; also known as Dalelehlū-ye Elyāsābād) is a village in Bakeshluchay Rural District, in the Central District of Urmia County, West Azerbaijan Province, Iran. At the 2006 census, its population was 741, in 218 families.
