= Tall Anjir, Mamasani =

Tall Anjir تل انجير
- Village
- Location within Iran
- Coordinates: 30°04′01″N 51°44′30″E
- Country: Iran
- Province: Fars
- County: Mamasani
- Bakhsh: Central
- Rural District: Bakesh-e Yek

Population (2006)
  - Total: 56
- Time zone: UTC+3:30 (IRST)
  - Summer (DST): UTC+4:30 (IRDT)

Tall Anjir (Persian: تل انجير, also Romanized as Tall Anjīr and Tol Anjīr) is a village in Bakesh-e Yek Rural District, in the Central District of Mamasani County, Fars province, Iran. At the 2006 census, its population was 56, in 12 families.
