= Almasabad, Selseleh =

Almasabad الماس اباد
- Village
- Location within Iran
- Coordinates: 33°53′36″N 48°12′26″E
- Country: Iran
- Province: Lorestan
- County: Selseleh
- Bakhsh: Central
- Rural District: Yusefvand

Population (2006)
  - Total: 175
- Time zone: UTC+3:30 (IRST)
  - Summer (DST): UTC+4:30 (IRDT)

Almasabad (Persian: الماس اباد, also Romanized as Almāsābād; also known as Elyāsābād) is a village in Yusefvand Rural District, in the Central District of Selseleh County, Lorestan Province, Iran. At the 2006 census, its population was 175, in 41 families.
