= Khoshkabad, Hormozgan =

Khoshkabad خشك اباد
- Village
- Location within Iran
- Coordinates: 27°02′23″N 57°01′18″E
- Country: Iran
- Province: Hormozgan
- County: Minab
- Bakhsh: Central
- Rural District: Band-e Zarak

Population (2006)
  - Total: 177
- Time zone: UTC+3:30 (IRST)
  - Summer (DST): UTC+4:30 (IRDT)

Khoshkabad (Persian: خشك اباد, also Romanized as Khoshkābād) is a village in Band-e Zarak Rural District, in the Central District of Minab County, Hormozgan Province, Iran. At the 2006 census, its population was 177, in 31 families.
