= Khoshkabad, Yazd =

Khoshkabad خشك اباد
- Village
- Location within Iran
- Coordinates: 31°42′49″N 53°56′42″E
- Country: Iran
- Province: Yazd
- County: Taft
- Bakhsh: Central
- Rural District: Aliabad

Population (2006)
  - Total: 107
- Time zone: UTC+3:30 (IRST)
  - Summer (DST): UTC+4:30 (IRDT)

Khoshkabad (Persian: خشك اباد, also Romanized as Khoshkābād) is a village in Aliabad Rural District, in the Central District of Taft County, Yazd Province, Iran. At the 2006 census, its population was 107, in 31 families.
