= Central District (Kuhchenar County) =

District in Fars province, Iran

Central District (Kuhchenar County) Persian: بخش مرکزی شهرستان کوه‌چنار
- District
- Location within Iran
- Coordinates: 29°49′33″N 51°34′28″E
- Country: Iran
- Province: Fars
- County: Kuhchenar
- Capital: Qaemiyeh
- Time zone: UTC+3:30 (IRST)

The Central District of Kuhchenar County (Persian: بخش مرکزی شهرستان کوه‌چنار) is in Fars province, Iran. Its capital is the city of Qaemiyeh, whose population at the time of the 2016 National Census was 26,918 in 7,298 households.

== History ==
In 2018, Kuhmareh and Somghan Rural Districts, and the cities of Nowdan and Qaemiyeh, were separated from Kazerun County in the establishment of Kuhchenar County, which was divided into two districts of two rural districts each, with Qaemiyeh as its capital.

== Demographics ==
=== Administrative divisions ===
Central District (Kuhchenar County)
Administrative Divisions
Chenar Shahijan RD
Somghan RD
Qaemiyeh (city)
RD = Rural District
