= Elyasabad, Ilam =

Elyasabad الياس اباد
- Village
- Location within Iran
- Coordinates: 33°12′17″N 47°22′01″E
- Country: Iran
- Province: Ilam
- County: Darreh Shahr
- Bakhsh: Central
- Rural District: Zarrin Dasht

Population (2006)
  - Total: 31
- Time zone: UTC+3:30 (IRST)
  - Summer (DST): UTC+4:30 (IRDT)

Elyasabad (Persian: الياس اباد, also Romanized as Elyāsābād) is a village in Zarrin Dasht Rural District, in the Central District of Darreh Shahr County, Ilam Province, Iran. At the 2006 census, its population was 31, in 5 families. The village is populated by Kurds.
