= Qaemiyeh =

City in Fars province, Iran

Qaemiyeh Persian: قائميه
- City
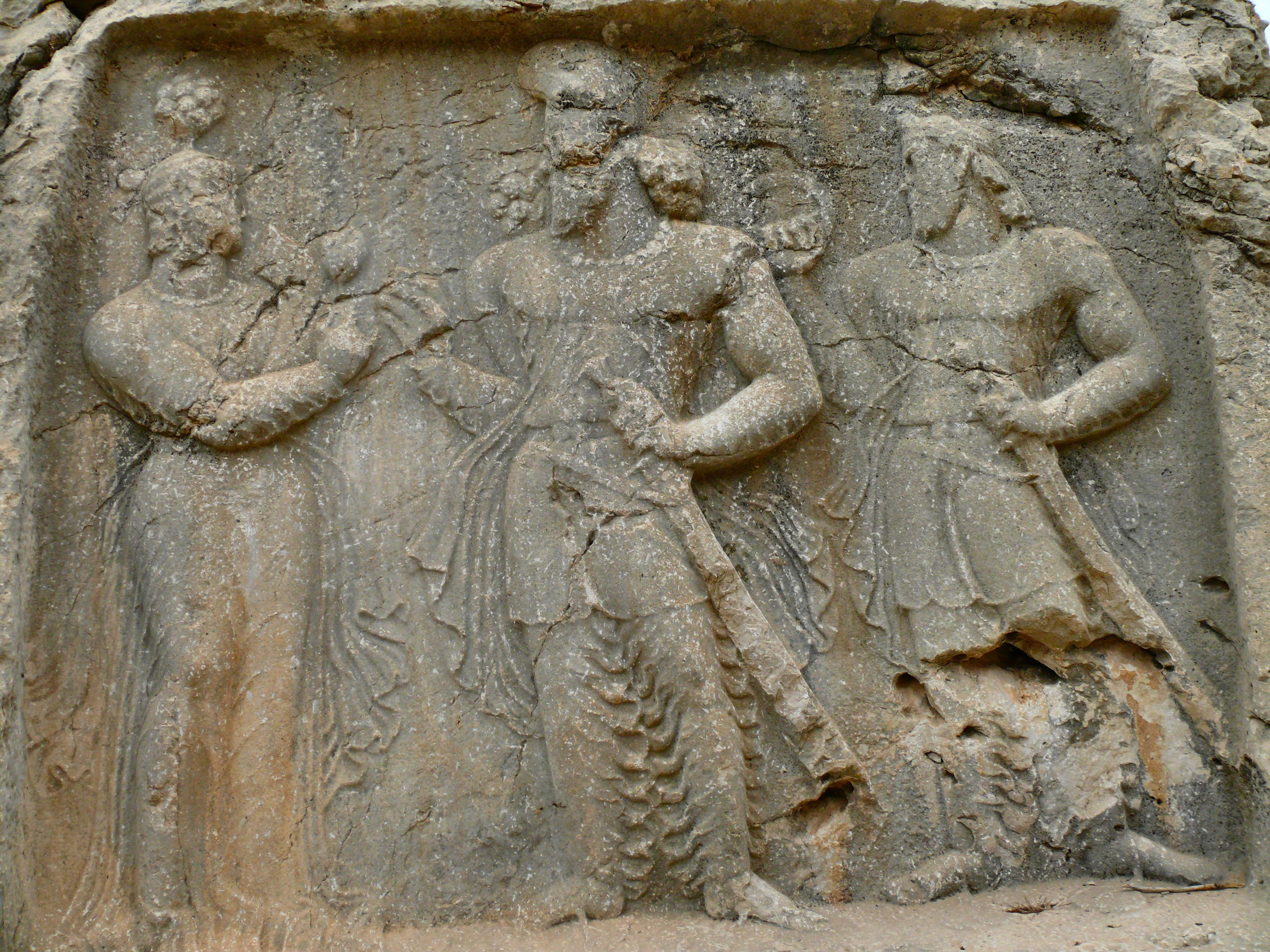
- Sarab-e Qandil relief near Qaemiyeh, depicting Sasanian emperor Bahram II receiving a flower from Anahita

- Location within Iran
- Coordinates: 29°51′09″N 51°35′03″E
- Country: Iran
- Province: Fars
- County: Kuhchenar
- District: Central

Population (2016)
  - Total: 26,918
- Time zone: UTC+3:30 (IRST)

Qaemiyeh (Persian: قائميه) (Note: Also romanized as Qā’emīyeh) is a city in the Central District of Kuhchenar County, Fars province, Iran, serving as capital of both the county and the district. The city is at the junction of Road 86 and Road 55.

== Demographics ==
=== Population ===
At the time of the 2006 National Census, the city's population was 23,734 in 5,054 households, when it was capital of the former Chenar Shahijan District of Kazerun County. The following census in 2011 counted 25,355 people in 6,314 households. The 2016 census measured the population of the city as 26,918 people in 7,298 households.

In 2018, the city was separated from the county in the establishment of Kuhchenar County and was transferred to the new Central District as the county's capital.
