= Ayazabad, Lorestan =

Ayazabad ايازاباد
- Village
- Location within Iran
- Coordinates: 33°38′48″N 48°37′09″E
- Country: Iran
- Province: Lorestan
- County: Khorramabad
- Bakhsh: Bayravand
- Rural District: Beyranvand-e Jonubi

Population (2006)
  - Total: 130
- Time zone: UTC+3:30 (IRST)
  - Summer (DST): UTC+4:30 (IRDT)

Ayazabad (Persian: ايازاباد, also Romanized as Ayāzābād; also known as Ayāzābād-e Kāsīān and Kāsīān-e Ayāzābād) is a village in Beyranvand-e Jonubi Rural District, Bayravand District, Khorramabad County, Lorestan Province, Iran. At the 2006 census, its population was 130, in 24 families.
