= Ganjeh, Ilam =

Ganjeh گنجه
- Village
- Location within Iran
- Coordinates: 33°24′24″N 46°49′38″E
- Country: Iran
- Province: Ilam
- County: Ilam
- Bakhsh: Sivan
- Rural District: Alishervan

Population (2006)
  - Total: 169
- Time zone: UTC+3:30 (IRST)
  - Summer (DST): UTC+4:30 (IRDT)

Ganjeh (Persian: گنجه) is a village in Alishervan Rural District, in the Sivan District of Ilam County, Ilam Province, Iran. At the 2006 census, its population was 169, in 35 families. The village is populated by Kurds.
