= Nowdan =

City in Fars province, Iran

Nowdan Persian: نودان
- City
- Location within Iran
- Coordinates: 29°48′02″N 51°41′30″E
- Country: Iran
- Province: Fars
- County: Kuhchenar
- District: Kuhmareh

Population (2016)
  - Total: 2,892
- Time zone: UTC+3:30 (IRST)

Nowdan (Persian: نودان) (Note: Also romanized as Naudān and Nowdān) is a city in, and the capital of, Kuhmareh District of Kuhchenar County, Fars province, Iran. It was the administrative center for Kuhmareh Rural District until its capital was transferred to the village of Malay-e Anbar.

== Demographics ==
=== Population ===
At the time of the 2006 National Census, the city's population was 2,589 in 581 households, when it was in Kazerun County. The following census in 2011 counted 2,574 people in 669 households. The 2016 census measured the population of the city as 2,892 people in 841 households.

In 2018, the city was separated from the county in the establishment of Kuhchenar County.
