= Ganjehi-ye Kohneh =

Ganjehi-ye Kohneh گنجه اي كهنه
- Village
- Location within Iran
- Coordinates: 30°44′31″N 51°33′11″E
- Country: Iran
- Province: Kohgiluyeh and Boyer-Ahmad
- County: Boyer-Ahmad
- Bakhsh: Central
- Rural District: Sarrud-e Shomali

Population (2006)
  - Total: 812
- Time zone: UTC+3:30 (IRST)
  - Summer (DST): UTC+4:30 (IRDT)

Ganjehi-ye Kohneh (Persian: گنجه اي كهنه, also Romanized as Ganjeh’ī-ye Kohneh; also known as Ganjeh, Ganjeh Kohneh, Ganjeh-ye Kohneh, and Kanjeh) is a village in Sarrud-e Shomali Rural District, in the Central District of Boyer-Ahmad County, Kohgiluyeh and Boyer-Ahmad Province, Iran. At the 2006 census, its population was 812, in 168 families.
