= Deris Rural District =

Rural district in Fars province, Iran

Deris Rural District Persian: دهستان دريس
- Rural District
- Location within Iran
- Coordinates: 29°39′23″N 51°36′09″E
- Country: Iran
- Province: Fars
- County: Kazerun
- District: Central
- Capital: Deris

Population (2016)
  - Total: 21,785
- Time zone: UTC+3:30 (IRST)

Deris Rural District (Persian: دهستان دريس), (Note: Formerly Chugan Rural District (دهستان چوگان)) is in the Central District of Kazerun County, Fars province, Iran. Its capital is the village of Deris.

== Demographics ==
=== Population ===
At the time of the 2006 National Census, the rural district's population (as Chugan Rural District) was 20,503 in 4,525 households. There were 20,818 inhabitants in 5,158 households at the following census of 2011. The 2016 census measured the population of the rural district as 21,785 in 5,558 households. The most populous of its 88 villages was Kheyratabad-e Barkatak, with 2,517 people.
