= Somghan Rural District =

Rural district in Fars province, Iran

Somghan Rural District Persian: دهستان سمغان
- Rural District
- Location within Iran
- Coordinates: 29°51′57″N 51°36′13″E
- Country: Iran
- Province: Fars
- County: Kuhchenar
- District: Central
- Capital: Somghan

Population (2016)
  - Total: 9,092
- Time zone: UTC+3:30 (IRST)

Somghan Rural District (Persian: دهستان سمغان) is in the Central District of Kuhchenar County, Fars province, Iran. Its capital is the village of Somghan. The previous capital of the rural district was the village of Malay-e Anbar.

== Demographics ==
=== Population ===
At the time of the 2006 National Census, the rural district's population (as a part of the former Chenar Shahijan District of Kazerun County) was 8,171 in 1,719 households. There were 8,434 inhabitants in 2,220 households at the following census of 2011. The 2016 census measured the population of the rural district as 9,092 in 2,528 households. The most populous of its 18 villages was Malay-e Anbar, with 4,594 people.

In 2018, the rural district was separated from the county in the establishment of Kuhchenar County and was transferred to the new Central District.
