= Kuhchenar County =

County in Fars province, Iran

Kuhchenar County Persian: شهرستان کوه‌چنار
- County
- Location of Kuhchenar County in Fars province (left, purple)

- Location of Fars province in Iran
- Coordinates: 29°45′N 51°42′E
- Country: Iran
- Province: Fars
- Capital: Qaemiyeh
- Districts: Central, Kuhmareh
- Time zone: UTC+3:30 (IRST)

Kuhchenar County (Persian: شهرستان کوه‌چنار) is in Fars province, Iran. Its capital is the city of Qaemiyeh, whose population at the time of the 2016 National Census was 26,918 in 7,298 households.

== History ==
In 2018, Kuhmareh and Somghan Rural Districts, and the cities of Nowdan and Qaemiyeh, were separated from Kazerun County in the establishment of Kuhchenar County, which was divided into two districts of two rural districts each, with Qaemiyeh as its capital.

== Demographics ==
=== Administrative divisions ===
Kuhchenar County's administrative structure is shown in the following table.

Kuhchenar County
Administrative Divisions
Central District
Chenar Shahijan RD
Somghan RD
Qaemiyeh (city)
Kuhmareh District
Abu ol Hayat RD
Kuhmareh RD
Nowdan (city)
RD = Rural District

== See also ==
Media related to Kuhchenar County at Wikimedia Commons
