= Shapur Rural District =

Rural district in Fars province, Iran

Shapur Rural District Persian: دهستان شاپور
- Rural District
- Location within Iran
- Coordinates: 29°46′49″N 51°35′23″E
- Country: Iran
- Province: Fars
- County: Kazerun
- District: Central
- Capital: Seyyed Hoseyn

Population (2016)
  - Total: 6,113
- Time zone: UTC+3:30 (IRST)

Shapur Rural District (Persian: دهستان شاپور) is in the Central District of Kazerun County, Fars province, Iran. Its capital is the village of Seyyed Hoseyn. The previous capital of the rural district was the village of Anarestan.

== Demographics ==
=== Population ===
At the time of the 2006 National Census, the rural district's population was 6,759 in 1,431 households. There were 5,889 inhabitants in 1,533 households at the following census of 2011. The 2016 census measured the population of the rural district as 6,113 in 1,843 households. The most populous of its 21 villages was Seyyed Hoseyn, with 1,225 people.
