= Kuhmareh Rural District =

Rural district in Fars province, Iran

Kuhmareh Rural District Persian: دهستان کوهمره
- Rural District
- Location within Iran
- Coordinates: 29°48′13″N 51°40′55″E
- Country: Iran
- Province: Fars
- County: Kuhchenar
- District: Kuhmareh
- Capital: Malay-e Anbar

Population (2016)
  - Total: 7,052
- Time zone: UTC+3:30 (IRST)

Kuhmareh Rural District (Persian: دهستان کوهمره) is in Kuhmareh District of Kuhchenar County, Fars province, Iran. Its capital is the village of Malay-e Anbar. The rural district was previously administered from the city of Nowdan.

== Demographics ==
=== Population ===
At the time of the 2006 National Census, the rural district's population (as a part of Kazerun County) was 9,356 in 2,136 households. There were 8,641 inhabitants in 2,203 households at the following census of 2011. The 2016 census measured the population of the rural district as 7,052 in 2,102 households. The most populous of its 24 villages was Chekak, with 1,208 people.

In 2018, the rural district was separated from the county in the establishment of Kuhchenar County.
