= Anarestan Rural District (Kazerun County) =

Rural district in Fars province, Iran

Anarestan Rural District Persian: دهستان انارستان
- Rural District
- Location within Iran
- Coordinates: 29°44′15″N 51°25′45″E
- Country: Iran
- Province: Fars
- County: Kazerun
- District: Central
- Capital: Anarestan

Population (2016)
  - Total: 9,628
- Time zone: UTC+3:30 (IRST)

Anarestan Rural District (Persian: دهستان انارستان) is in the Central District of Kazerun County, Fars province, Iran. Its capital is the village of Anarestan.

== Demographics ==
=== Population ===
At the time of the 2006 National Census, the rural district's population (as a part of the former Chenar Shahijan District) was 11,070 in 2,414 households. There were 9,610 inhabitants in 2,666 households at the following census of 2011. The 2016 census measured the population of the rural district as 9,628 in 2,773 households. The most populous of its 20 villages was Hakim Bashi-ye Bala, with 1,634 people.

After the census, the rural district was transferred to the Central District.
