= Balyan Rural District =

Rural district in Fars province, Iran

Balyan Rural District Persian: دهستان بليان
- Rural District
- Location within Iran
- Coordinates: 29°33′48″N 51°42′48″E
- Country: Iran
- Province: Fars
- County: Kazerun
- District: Central
- Capital: Mehrenjan

Population (2016)
  - Total: 17,476
- Time zone: UTC+3:30 (IRST)

Balyan Rural District (Persian: دهستان بليان) is in the Central District of Kazerun County, Fars province, Iran. Its capital is the village of Mehrenjan.

== Demographics ==
=== Population ===
At the time of the 2006 National Census, the rural district's population was 17,089 in 3,491 households. There were 17,468 inhabitants in 4,121 households at the following census of 2011. The 2016 census measured the population of the rural district as 17,476 in 4,729 households. The most populous of its 86 villages was Mehrenjan, with 3,598 people.
