= Dasht-e Barm Rural District =

Rural district in Fars province, Iran

Dasht-e Barm Rural District Persian: دهستان دشت برم
- Rural District
- Location within Iran
- Coordinates: 29°32′55″N 51°55′25″E
- Country: Iran
- Province: Fars
- County: Kazerun
- District: Central
- Capital: Kalani

Population (2016)
  - Total: 6,135
- Time zone: UTC+3:30 (IRST)

Dasht-e Barm Rural District (Persian: دهستان دشت برم) is in the Central District of Kazerun County, Fars province, Iran. Its capital is the village of Kalani.

== Demographics ==
=== Population ===
At the time of the 2006 National Census, the rural district's population (as a part of Kuhmareh District) was 6,690 in 1,474 households. There were 5,941 inhabitants in 1,563 households at the following census of 2011. The 2016 census measured the population of the rural district as 6,135 in 1,741 households. The most populous of its 21 villages was Kalani, with 1,985 people.

After the census, the rural district was transferred to the Central District.
