= Chenar Shahijan District =

Former district in Fars province, Iran

Chenar Shahijan District Persian: بخش چنار شاهيجان
- Former District
- Location within Iran
- Coordinates: 29°47′N 51°29′E
- Country: Iran
- Province: Fars
- County: Kazerun
- Capital: Qaemiyeh

Population (2016)
  - Total: 45,638
- Time zone: UTC+3:30 (IRST)

Chenar Shahijan District (Persian: بخش چنار شاهيجان) is a former administrative division of Kazerun County, Fars province, Iran. Its capital was the city of Qaemiyeh.

== History ==
After the 2016 National Census, Anarestan Rural District was transferred to the Central District. Somghan Rural District and the city of Qaemiyeh were separated from the county in the establishment of Kuhchenar County.

== Demographics ==
=== Population ===
At the time of the 2006 census, the district's population was 42,975 in 9,187 households. The following census in 2011 counted 43,399 people in 11,200 households. The 2016 census measured the population of the district as 45,638 inhabitants in 12,599 households.

=== Administrative divisions ===
Chenar Shahijan District Population
Administrative Divisions	2006	2011	2016
Anarestan RD (Note: Transferred to the Central District after the 2016 census)	11,070	9,610	9,628
Somghan RD (Note: Transferred to Kuhchenar County after the 2016 census)	8,171	8,434	9,092
Qaemiyeh (city)	23,734	25,355	26,918
Total	42,975	43,399	45,638
RD = Rural District
