= Kuhmareh District =

District in Fars province, Iran

Kuhmareh District Persian: بخش کوهمره
- District
- Location within Iran
- Coordinates: 29°44′50″N 51°46′11″E
- Country: Iran
- Province: Fars
- County: Kuhchenar
- Capital: Nowdan

Population (2016)
  - Total: 16,079
- Time zone: UTC+3:30 (IRST)

Kuhmareh District (Persian: بخش کوهمره) is in Kuhchenar County, Fars province, Iran. Its capital is the city of Nowdan.

== Demographics ==
=== Population ===
At the time of the 2006 National Census, the district's population (as a part of Kazerun County) was 18,635 in 4,191 households. The following census in 2011 counted 17,156 people in 4,435 households. The 2016 census measured the population of the district as 16,079 inhabitants in 4,684 households.

In 2018, Abu ol Hayat Rural District was created in the district and Dasht-e Barm Rural District was separated from it to join the Central District. Kuhmareh District was separated from the county in the establishment of Kuhchenar County.

=== Administrative divisions ===
Kuhmareh District Population (Note: As a part of Kazerun County at the 2006, 2011, and 2016 censuses)
Administrative Divisions	2006	2011	2016
Abu ol Hayat RD (Note: Established after the 2016 census)			
Dasht-e Barm RD (Note: Transferred to the Central District after the 2016 census)	6,690	5,941	6,135
Kuhmareh RD	9,356	8,641	7,052
Nowdan (city)	2,589	2,574	2,892
Total	18,635	17,156	16,079
RD = Rural District
