= Central District (Kazerun County) =

District in Fars province, Iran

Central District (Kazerun County) Persian: بخش مرکزی شهرستان کازرون
- District
- Location within Iran
- Coordinates: 29°38′N 51°43′E
- Country: Iran
- Province: Fars
- County: Kazerun
- Capital: Kazerun

Population (2016)
  - Total: 142,057
- Time zone: UTC+3:30 (IRST)

The Central District of Kazerun County (Persian: بخش مرکزی شهرستان کازرون) is in Fars province, Iran. Its capital is the city of Kazerun.

== History ==
In 2018, Anarestan Rural District was transferred from Chenar Shahijan District, and Dasht-e Barm Rural District from Kuhmareh District, to the Central District.

== Demographics ==
=== Population ===
At the time of the 2006 National Census, the district's population was 128,945 in 30,257 households. The following census in 2011 counted 133,860 people in 35,846 households. The 2016 census measured the population of the district as 142,057 inhabitants in 41,118 households.

=== Administrative divisions ===
Central District (Kazerun County) Population
Administrative Divisions	2006	2011	2016
Anarestan RD (Note: Transferred from Chenar Shahijan District after the 2016 census)			
Balyan RD	17,089	17,468	17,476
Dasht-e Barm RD (Note: Transferred from Kuhmareh District after the 2016 census)			
Deris RD (Note: Formerly Chugan Rural District)	20,503	20,818	21,785
Shapur RD	6,759	5,889	6,113
Kazerun (city)	84,594	89,685	96,683
Total	128,945	133,860	142,057
RD = Rural District
