= Eslamabad =

Eslamabad (Persian: اسلام آباد) may refer to the following places in Iran:

== Alborz Province ==
- Eslamabad, Alborz, a village

== Ardabil Province ==
- Eslamabad, Ardabil, a village in Nir County
- Eslamabad, Parsabad, a city in Parsabad County
- Shahsavarlu, a village in Kowsar County
- Eslamabad-e Jadid, a village in Parsabad County
- Eslamabad-e Sofla, Ardabil, a village in Parsabad County

== Bushehr Province ==
- Eslamabad, Dashtestan, a village in Dashtestan County
- Eslamabad, Dashti, a village in Dashti County
- Eslamabad, Ganaveh, a village in Ganaveh County
- Eslamabad, Jam, a village in Jam County

== Chaharmahal and Bakhtiari Province ==
- Eslamabad, Ardal, a village in Ardal County
- Eslamabad, Borujen, a village in Borujen County
- Eslamabad, Kiar, a village in Kiar County
- Eslamabad, Naghan, a village in Kiar County
- Eslamabad, Lordegan, a village in Lordegan County
- Eslamabad, Falard, a village in Lordegan County
- Eslamabad-e Yek, Chaharmahal and Bakhtiari, a village in Lordegan County

== East Azerbaijan Province ==
- Eslamabad, Charuymaq, a village in Charuymaq County
- Eslamabad, Mianeh, a village in Mianeh County
- Eslamabad, Sarab, a village in Sarab County
- Eslamabad-e Mashnaq, a village in Shabestar County

== Fars Province ==
=== Arsanjan County ===
- Eslamabad, Arsanjan, a village in Arsanjan County

=== Darab County ===
- Eslamabad, Bakhtajerd, a village in Darab County
- Eslamabad, Qaryah ol Kheyr, a village in Darab County
- Eslamabad-e Ghani, a village in Darab County

=== Eqlid County ===
- Eslamabad, Eqlid, a village in Eqlid County

=== Fasa County ===
- Eslamabad, Fasa, a village in Fasa County

=== Firuzabad County ===
- Eslamabad, Firuzabad, a village in Firuzabad County

=== Jahrom County ===
- Eslamabad, Jahrom, a village in Jahrom County

=== Kazerun County ===
- Eslamabad, Kazerun, a village in Kazerun County
- Eslamabad, Famur, a village in Kazerun County
- Eslamabad, Jereh, a village in Kazerun County
- Eslamabad, Khesht, a village in Kazerun County
- Eslamabad-e Tang Shib, a village in Kazerun County

=== Kharameh County ===
- Eslamabad, Kharameh, a village in Kharameh County

=== Larestan County ===
- Eslamabad, Larestan, a village in Larestan County

=== Mamasani County ===
- Eslamabad, Mamasani, a village in Mamasani County
- Eslamabad, Doshman Ziari, a village in Mamasani County
- Eslamabad, Javid-e Mahuri, a village in Mamasani County

=== Marvdasht County ===
- Eslamabad, Marvdasht, a village in Marvdasht County

=== Neyriz County ===
- Eslamabad, Neyriz, a village in Neyriz County
- Eslamabad, Qatruyeh, a village in Neyriz County

=== Pasargad County ===
- Eslamabad, Pasargad, a village in Pasargad County

=== Qir and Karzin County ===
- Eslamabad, Qir and Karzin, a village in Qir and Karzin County

=== Rostam County ===
- Eslamabad, Rostam, a village in Rostam County

=== Sarvestan County ===
- Eslamabad, Sarvestan, a village in Sarvestan County

=== Sepidan County ===
- Eslamabad, Sepidan, a village in Sepidan County

=== Shiraz County ===
- Eslamabad, Shiraz, a village in Shiraz County
- Eslamabad, Kuh Mareh Sorkhi, a village in Shiraz County
- Eslamabad-e Chehel Cheshmeh, a village in Shiraz County

== Gilan Province ==
- Eslamabad, Gilan, a village in Sowme'eh Sara County
- Eslamabad Rural District (Gilan Province), in Rasht County

== Golestan Province ==
- Eslamabad, Maraveh Tappeh, a village in Maraveh Tappeh County
- Eslamabad-e Fenderesk, a village in Aliabad County
- Eslamabad-e Bala, a village in Aqqala County
- Eslamabad-e Pain, Golestan, a village in Aqqala County
- Eslamabad-e Qeshlaq, a village in Azadshahr County
- Eslamabad-e Gonbad, a village in Gonbad-e Qabus County
- Eslamabad-e Jelin, a village in Gorgan County
- Eslamabad-e Shadeh, a village in Kordkuy County
- Eslamabad-e Olya, Golestan, a village in Ramian County
- Eslamabad-e Sofla, Golestan, a village in Ramian County

== Hamadan Province ==
- Eslamabad, Bahar, a village in Bahar County
- Eslamabad, Malayer, a village in Malayer County
- Eslamabad, alternate name of Shad Kandi, a village in Malayer County

== Hormozgan Province ==
- Eslamabad, Bandar Abbas, a village in Bandar Abbas County
- Eslamabad, Bandar Lengeh, a village in Bandar Lengeh County
- Eslamabad, Bashagard, a village in Bashagard County
- Eslamabad, Minab, a village in Minab County
- Eslamabad, Senderk, a village in Minab County
- Eslamabad Rudan Rural District, a rural district in Bikah District, Rudan County
- Eslamabad, Rudan, a village in Rudan County

== Ilam Province ==
- Eslamabad-e Olya, Ilam, a village in Darreh Shahr County
- Eslamabad-e Sofla, Ilam, a village in Darreh Shahr County

== Isfahan Province ==
- Eslamabad, Ardestan, a village in Ardestan County
- Eslamabad-e Makdin, a village in Fereydunshahr County
- Eslamabad-e Mugui, a village in Fereydunshahr County
- Eslamabad, Najafabad, a village in Najafabad County
- Eslamabad, Hana, a village in Semirom County
- Eslamabad, Vardasht, a village in Semirom County
- Eslamabad-e Qarakhlu, a village in Semirom County
- Eslamabad, Shahreza, a village in Shahreza County

== Kerman Province ==
- Eslamabad, Arzuiyeh, a village in Arzuiyeh County
- Eslamabad, Soghan, a village in Arzuiyeh County
- Eslamabad, Baft, a village in Baft County
- Eslamabad, Bam, a village in Bam County
- Eslamabad-e 21, a village in Bardsir County
- Eslamabad-e Chah Narenj, a village in Faryab County
- Eslamabad-e Darvish Khanka, a village in Faryab County
- Eslamabad, Jiroft, a village in Jiroft County
- Eslamabad, Sarduiyeh, a village in Jiroft County
- Eslamabad Rural District (Jiroft County), an administrative subdivision of Jiroft County
- Eslamabad-e Dowlatabad, a village in Kerman County
- Eslamabad (1), a village in Manujan County
- Eslamabad (2), a village in Manujan County
- Eslamabad, Qaleh Ganj, a village in Qaleh Ganj County
- Eslamabad-e Kahan Changar, a village in Qaleh Ganj County
- Eslamabad-e Sar Meydan, a village in Qaleh Ganj County
- Eslamabad, Rabor, a village in Rabor County
- Eslamabad, Rafsanjan, a village in Rafsanjan County
- Eslamabad-e Kahur Khoshk, a village in Rigan County
- Eslamabad, Dehaj, a village in Shahr-e Babak County
- Eslamabad, Chahar Gonbad, a village in Sirjan County
- Eslamabad, Pariz, a village in Sirjan County
- Eslamabad, Zeydabad, a village in Sirjan County
- Reyhan Shahr, formerly Eslamabad, a city in Zarand County
- Eslamabad Rural District (Zarand County), an administrative subdivision of Zarand County

== Kermanshah Province ==
- Eslamabad-e Gharb, a city in Kermanshah Province, Iran
- Eslamabad-e Gharb County, an administrative subdivision of Iran
- Eslamabad, Kermanshah, a village in Kangavar County
- Eslamabad-e Bezahrud, a village in Sahneh County
- Eslamabad-e Olya, Kermanshah, a village in Sahneh County
- Eslamabad-e Sofla, Kermanshah, a village in Sahneh County

== Khuzestan Province ==
- Eslamabad, Andika, a village in Andika County
- Eslamabad, Bagh-e Malek, a village in Bagh-e Malek County
- Eslamabad, Behbahan, a village in Behbahan County
- Eslamabad-e Olya, Khuzestan, a village in Behbahan County
- Eslamabad-e Sofla, Khuzestan, a village in Behbahan County
- Eslamabad, Dezful, a village in Dezful County
- Eslamabad, Shahi, a village in Dezful County
- Eslamabad, Haftgel, a village in Haftgel County
- Eslamabad, Izeh, a village in Izeh County
- Eslamabad, Karun, a village in Karun County
- Eslamabad-e Do, a village in Karun County
- Eslamabad, Omidiyeh, a village in Omidiyeh County
- Eslamabad, Ramshir, a village in Ramshir County

== Kohgiluyeh and Boyer-Ahmad Province ==
- Eslamabad-e Baba Ahmad, a village in Bahmai County
- Eslamabad, Basht, a village in Basht County
- Eslamabad, Kakan, a village in Boyer-Ahmad County
- Eslamabad, Sarrud-e Jonubi, a village in Boyer-Ahmad County
- Eslamabad, Sarrud-e Shomali, a village in Boyer-Ahmad County
- Eslamabad, Sepidar, a village in Boyer-Ahmad County
- Eslamabad-e Heydarabad, a village in Boyer-Ahmad County
- Eslamabad-e Deh Now, a village in Charam County
- Eslamabad-e Mashayekh, a village in Charam County
- Eslamabad, Dana, a village in Dana County
- Eslamabad-e Bagh-e Nar, a village in Gachsaran County
- Eslamabad-e Lishtar, a village in Gachsaran County
- Eslamabad-e Nazmakan, a village in Gachsaran County

== Kurdistan Province ==
- Eslamabad, Bijar, a village in Bijar County
- Eslamabad, Divandarreh, a village in Divandarreh County
- Eslamabad, Kamyaran, a village in Kamyaran County
- Eslamabad, Qorveh, a village in Qorveh County
- Eslamabad, Saqqez, a village in Saqqez County
- Eslamabad, Ziviyeh, a village in Saqqez County

== Lorestan Province ==
=== Aligudarz County ===
- Eslamabad, Aligudarz, a village in Aligudarz County
- Eslamabad-e Sheykh Miri, a village in Aligudarz County
- Eslamabad, Besharat, a village in Aligudarz County
- Eslamabad Mohammad Hoseyn, a village in Aligudarz County

=== Borujerd County ===
- Eslamabad, Borujerd, a village in Borujerd County

=== Delfan County ===
- Eslamabad Gamasyab Olya, a village in Delfan County
- Eslamabad Gamasyab Sofla, a village in Delfan County

=== Dowreh County ===
- Eslamabad, Dowreh, a village in Dowreh County

=== Khorramabad County ===
- Eslamabad Barg Beydi, a village in Khorramabad County
- Eslamabad, alternate name of Bid Hal, a village in Khorramabad County
- Eslamabad-e Olya, Khorramabad, a village in Khorramabad County
- Eslamabad-e Sofla, Lorestan, a village in Khorramabad County

=== Kuhdasht County ===
- Gari Eslamabad, a village in Kuhdasht County

=== Pol-e Dokhtar County ===
- Eslamabad-e Yaran Parviz, a village in Pol-e Dokhtar County
- Eslamabad-e Olya, Pol-e Dokhtar, a village in Pol-e Dokhtar County

=== Selseleh County ===
- Eslamabad, alternate name of Rig-e Sefid, Selseleh, a village in Selseleh County

== Mazandaran Province ==
- Eslamabad, Amol, a village in Amol County
- Eslamabad, Fereydunkenar, a village in Fereydunkenar County
- Eslamabad, Mahmudabad, a village in Mahmudabad County
- Eslamabad, Miandorud, a village in Miandorud County
- Eslamabad, Nowshahr, a village in Nowshahr County

== North Khorasan Province ==
- Eslamabad, North Khorasan, a village in Maneh and Samalqan County
- Eslamabad-e Karkhaneh-ye Qand, a village in Shirvan County
- Eslamabad-e Kord, a village in Maneh and Samalqan County
- Eslamabad, alternate name of Kharashah, a village in Jajrom County

== Qazvin Province ==
- Eslamabad, Qazvin, a village in Abyek County, Iran

== Qom Province ==
- Eslamabad, Qom, a village in Qom Province, Iran
- Eslamabad, Salafchegan, a village in Qom Province, Iran

== Razavi Khorasan Province ==
- Eslamabad, Bardaskan, a village in Bardaskan County
- Eslamabad, Chenaran, a village in Chenaran County
- Eslamabad, Mashhad, a village in Mashhad County
- Eslamabad-e Chahar Gavareh, a village in Mashhad County
- Eslamabad, Nishapur, a village in Nishapur County
- Eslamabad-e Arab, a village in Nishapur County
- Eslamabad-e Lakazi, a village in Nishapur County
- Eslamabad, Quchan, a village in Quchan County
- Eslamabad, Bajgiran, a village in Quchan County
- Eslamabad, Rashtkhvar, a village in Rashtkhvar County
- Eslamabad-e Khalaj, a village in Torbat-e Heydarieh County
- Eslamabad, Torbat-e Jam, a village in Torbat-e Jam County

== Semnan Province ==
- Eslamabad, Garmsar, a village in Garmsar County
- Eslamabad, Shahrud, a village in Shahrud County

== Sistan and Baluchestan Province ==
- Eslamabad, Bampur, a village in Bampur County
- Eslamabad-e Pain, Sistan and Baluchestan, a village in Chabahar County
- Eslamabad, Irandegan, a village in Khash County
- Eslamabad, Gowhar Kuh, a village in Khash County
- Eslamabad, alternate name of Kalleh-ye Espid-e Eslamabad, a village in Khash County
- Eslamabad-e Garnechin, a village in Khash County

== South Khorasan Province ==
- Eslamabad, Shusef, a village in Nehbandan County

== Tehran Province ==
- Eslamabad, Damavand, a village in Damavand County
- Eslamabad, Azimiyeh, a village in Rey County
- Eslamabad, Ghaniabad, a village in Rey County

== West Azerbaijan Province ==
- Eslamabad, Mahabad, a village in Mahabad County
- Eslamabad, Miandoab, a village in Miandoab County
- Eslamabad, Naqadeh, a village in Naqadeh County
- Eslamabad, Oshnavieh, a village in Oshnavieh County
- Eslamabad, Sardasht, a village in Sardasht County
- Eslamabad, Urmia, a village in Urmia County

== Yazd Province ==
- Eslamabad, Khatam, a village in Khatam County
- Eslamabad, Saduq, a village in Saduq County
- Eslamabad, Taft, a village in Taft County

== Zanjan Province ==
- Eslamabad, Khodabandeh, a village in Khodabandeh County
- Eslamabad, Khorramdarreh, a village in Khorramdarreh County
- Eslamabad, Zanjan, a village in Zanjan County

== See also ==
- Eslamabad Rural District (disambiguation)
- Eslamabad-e Olya (disambiguation)
- Eslamabad-e Sofla (disambiguation)
- Islamabad (disambiguation)
- Shahrak-e Eslamabad (disambiguation)
