= Eslamabad-e Olya =

Eslamabad-e Olya (Persian: اسلام ابادعليا) may refer to:

- Eslamabad Gamasyab Olya, a village in Delfan County, Lorestan Province, Iran
- Eslamabad-e Olya, Golestan
- Eslamabad-e Olya, Ilam
- Eslamabad-e Olya, Kermanshah
- Eslamabad-e Olya, Khuzestan
- Eslamabad-e Olya, Khorramabad, a village in Khorramabad County, Lorestan Province, Iran
- Eslamabad-e Olya, Pol-e Dokhtar, a village in Pol-e Dokhtar County, Lorestan Province, Iran
