= Dargi, Iran =

Dargi (Persian: درگي) may refer to:

- Dargi, Hormozgan
- Dargi, Kerman
- Dargi, Khuzestan
