= Eslamabad-e Olya, Lorestan =

Eslamabad-e Olya, Lorestan may refer to:

- Eslamabad-e Olya, Khorramabad
- Eslamabad-e Olya, Pol-e Dokhtar
