= Eslamabad-e Sofla =

Eslamabad-e Sofla (Persian: اسلام ابادسفلي) may refer to:

- Eslamabad Gamasyab Sofla, a village in Delfan County, Lorestan Province, Iran
- Eslamabad-e Sofla, Ardabil
- Eslamabad-e Sofla, Golestan
- Eslamabad-e Sofla, Ilam
- Eslamabad-e Sofla, Kermanshah
- Eslamabad-e Sofla, Khuzestan
- Eslamabad-e Sofla, Lorestan
