= Rig Sefid =

Rig Sefid (Persian: ريگ سفيد) may refer to:

- Rig Sefid, Dehpir-e Shomali, a village in Dehpir-e Shomali Rural District, Central District of Khorramabad County, Lorestan Province, Iran
- Rig Sefid, Zagheh, a village in Zagheh Rural District, Zagheh District, Khorramabad County, Lorestan Province, Iran
- Rig Sefid, Selseleh, a village in Selseleh County, Lorestan Province, Iran
