= Eslamabad-e Yek =

Eslamabad-e Yek (Persian: اسلام آباديك or اسلام اباديك) may refer to:

- Eslamabad-e Yek, Chaharmahal and Bakhtiari
- Eslamabad-e Yek, Kerman
