= Eslamabad-e Pain =

Eslamabad-e Pain (Persian: اسلام ابادپايين) may refer to:

- Eslamabad-e Pain, Golestan
- Eslamabad-e Pain, Sistan and Baluchestan
