= Shahrak-e Eslamabad =

Shahrak-e Eslamabad (Persian: شهرك اسلام اباد) may refer to:

- Shahrak-e Eslamabad, Khuzestan
- Shahrak-e Eslamabad, Mazandaran
- Shahrak-e Eslamabad, Sistan and Baluchestan

== See also ==
- Eslamabad (disambiguation)
