= Langarud (disambiguation) =

Langarud or Langerud or Langrud or Lankarud or Langrood (Persian: لنگرود) may refer to:

- Langarud, a city in Gilan province
- Langarud County, an administrative division of Gilan province
- Langerud, Markazi
- Langerud, Qom
- Langarud-e Gharbi Rural District, an administrate division of Mazandaran province
- Langarud-e Sharqi Rural District, an administrate division of Mazandaran province
