= Islamabad (disambiguation) =

Islamabad may refer to:

- Islamabad, the national capital of Pakistan
- Islamabad Capital Territory, a federal territory of Pakistan that includes the capital Islamabad and other areas

Islamabad may also refer to:

== Places ==
- Islamabad Union, Eidgaon, a union council in Cox's Bazar District, Bangladesh
- Islamabad Union, Matlab North, a union council in Chandpur District, Bangladesh
- Chittagong, historically known as Islamabad, a city in Bangladesh
- Bhalwa, renamed by the Mughals to Islamabad, a former city in Bangladesh
- Anantnag, also known as Islamabad, a city in Jammu and Kashmir, India
- Eslamabad, name of various places in Iran
- Islamabad, Saroke, a locality in Punjab, Pakistan
- Islamabad, Tilford, the international headquarters of the Ahmadiyya Muslim Community in England

== Sports ==
- Islamabad United, a professional cricket team based in Islamabad that competes in the Pakistan Super League

== Other uses ==
- SS Islamabad, a Pakistani steamship in service from 1951 to at least 1972

== See also ==
- Islampur (disambiguation)
