= Islampur =

Islampur (City of Islam) may refer to:

== Bangladesh ==
- Islampur Upazila, a subdistrict of Jamalpur, Bangladesh
- Islampur, a municipality of Islampur
- Islampur, a Union Parishad of Kamalganj Upazila, Moulvibazar District, Bangladesh
- Islampur, Jagannathpur, a village in Syedpur-Shaharpara Union Parishad, Jagannathpur Upazila, Sunamganj District
- Islampur is a place located in the southern district of Dhaka city.

== India ==
- Islampur, Nalanda, a town in Nalanda district, Bihar, India
  - Islampur, Bihar Assembly constituency, Assembly constituency in Nalanda district, Bihar, India
- Uran Islampur, a city in Sangli district, Maharashtra, India
  - Islampur, Maharashtra Assembly constituency, Assembly constituency in Sangli district, Maharashtra, India
- Islampur, Ratnagiri district, a village in Maharashtra, India
- Islampur, Murshidabad, a census town in Murshidabad district, West Bengal, India
- Islampur, Uttar Dinajpur, a town in Uttar Dinajpur district, West Bengal, India
  - Islampur, West Bengal Assembly constituency, Assembly constituency in Uttar Dinajpur district, West Bengal, India
- Islampur subdivision in Uttar Dinajpur district, West Bengal, India
- Islampur, Uttar Dinajpur (community development block), Uttar Dinajpur district, West Bengal, India

== See also ==
- Islamabad (disambiguation)
