= Jannatabad, Qom =

Village in Qom province, Iran

Jannatabad Persian: جنت‌آباد
- Village
- Location within Iran
- Coordinates: 34°30′52″N 51°04′10″E
- Country: Iran
- Province: Qom
- County: Qom
- District: Central
- Rural District: Qanavat

Population (2016)
  - Total: 2,476
- Time zone: UTC+3:30 (IRST)

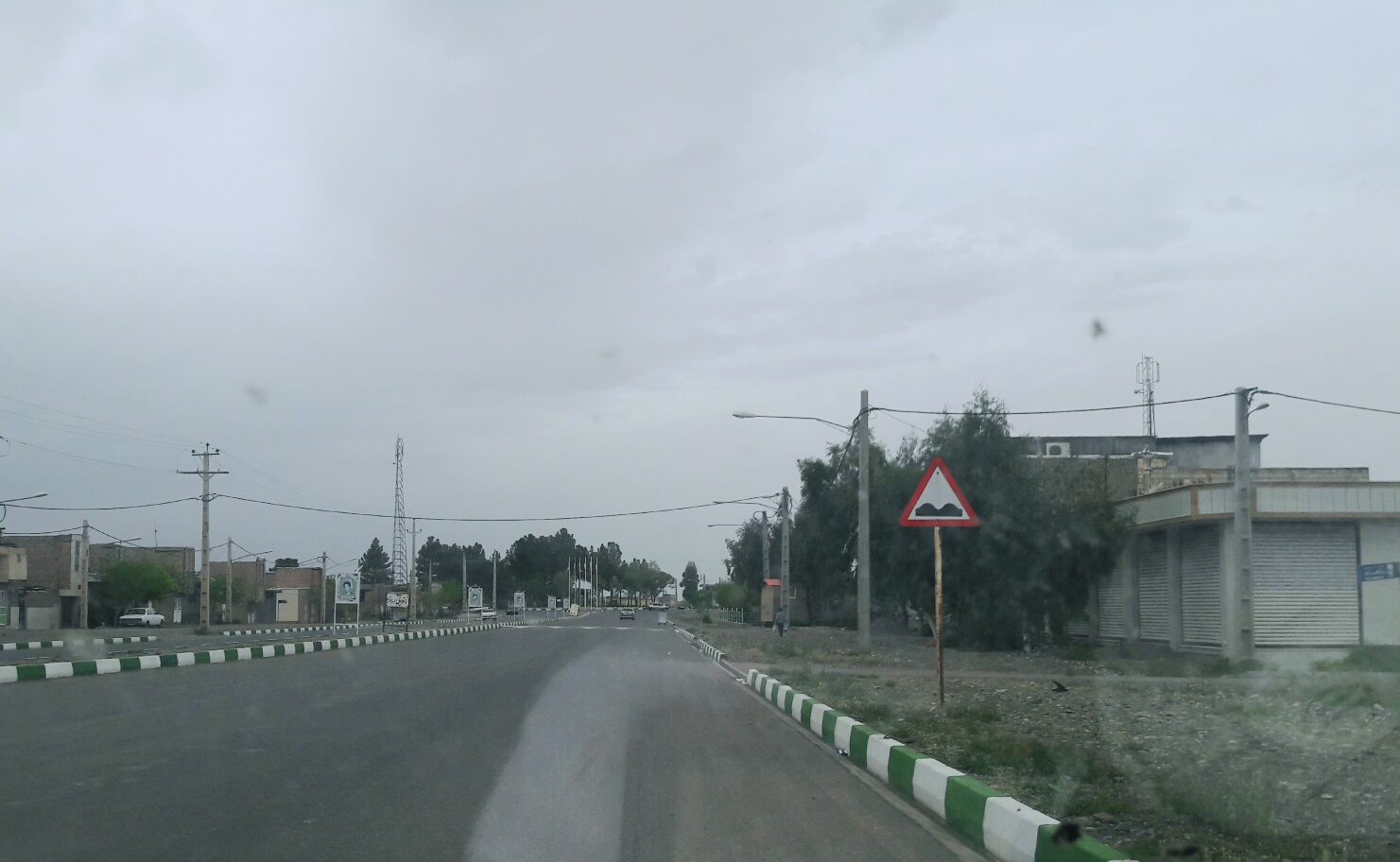

Jannatabad (Persian: جنت‌آباد) (Note: Also romanized as Jannatābād) is a village in Qanavat Rural District of the Central District in Qom County, Qom province, Iran.

== Demographics ==
=== Population ===
At the time of the 2006 National Census, the village's population was 1,784 in 401 households. The following census in 2011 counted 2,001 people in 502 households. The 2016 census measured the population of the village as 2,476 people in 692 households, the most populous in its rural district.
