= Shamsabad, Qom =

Village in Qom province, Iran

Shamsabad Persian: شمس اباد
- Village
- Location within Iran
- Country: Iran
- Province: Qom
- County: Qom
- District: Central
- Rural District: Qanavat

Population (2016)
  - Total: 0
- Time zone: UTC+3:30 (IRST)

Shamsabad (Persian: شمس اباد) (Note: Also romanized as Shamsābād; also known as Shamsābād-e Gā'īnī Hā) is a village in Qanavat Rural District of the Central District in Qom County, Qom province, Iran.

== Demographics ==
=== Population ===
At the time of the 2006 National Census, the village's population was 625 in 137 households. The following census in 2011 counted 22 people in five households. The 2016 census measured the population of the village as zero.
