= Mobarakabad, Qom =

Village in Qom province, Iran

Mobarakabad Persian: مبارك اباد
- Village
- Location within Iran
- Coordinates: 34°36′47″N 50°59′24″E
- Country: Iran
- Province: Qom
- County: Qom
- District: Central
- Rural District: Qanavat

Population (2016)
  - Total: 2,083
- Time zone: UTC+3:30 (IRST)

Mobarakabad (Persian: مبارک‌آباد) (Note: Also romanized as Mobārakābād) is a village in Qanavat Rural District of the Central District in Qom County, Qom province, Iran.

== Demographics ==
=== Population ===
At the time of the 2006 National Census, the village's population was 628 in 147 households. The following census in 2011 counted 1,374 people in 353 households. The 2016 census measured the population of the village as 2,083 people in 546 households.
