= Hajjiabad-e Aqa =

Village in Qom province, Iran

Hajjiabad-e Aqa Persian: حاجي اباداقا
- Village
- Location within Iran
- Coordinates: 34°36′00″N 50°58′57″E
- Country: Iran
- Province: Qom
- County: Qom
- District: Central
- Rural District: Qanavat

Population (2016)
  - Total: 494
- Time zone: UTC+3:30 (IRST)

Hajjiabad-e Aqa (Persian: حاجي اباداقا) (Note: Also romanized as Ḩājīābād-e Āqā and Ḩajjīābād-e Āqā) is a village in, and the capital of, Qanavat Rural District in the Central District of Qom County, Qom province, Iran.

== Demographics ==
=== Population ===
At the time of the 2006 National Census, the village's population was 291 in 63 households. The following census in 2011 counted 398 people in 112 households. The 2016 census measured the population of the village as 494 people in 146 households.
