= Sarajeh, Qom =

Village in Qom province, Iran

Sarajeh Persian: سراجه
- Village
- Location within Iran
- Coordinates: 34°36′49″N 51°03′56″E
- Country: Iran
- Province: Qom
- County: Qom
- District: Central
- Rural District: Qanavat

Population (2016)
  - Total: 719
- Time zone: UTC+3:30 (IRST)

Sarajeh (Persian: سراجه) (Note: Also romanized as Sarājeh) is a village in Qanavat Rural District of the Central District in Qom County, Qom province, Iran.

== Demographics ==
=== Population ===
At the time of the 2006 National Census, the village's population was 369 in 89 households. The following census in 2011 counted 688 people in 195 households. The 2016 census measured the population of the village as 719 people in 217 households.

== Notable people ==
- Mohammad Hossein Fahmideh, Iranian war hero
