= Navaran =

Village in Qom province, Iran

Navaran Persian: نواران
- Village
- Location within Iran
- Coordinates: 34°35′48″N 51°04′48″E
- Country: Iran
- Province: Qom
- County: Qom
- District: Central
- Rural District: Qanavat

Population (2016)
  - Total: 383
- Time zone: UTC+3:30 (IRST)

Navaran (Persian: نواران) (Note: Also romanized as Navārān; also known as Nabarān) is a village in Qanavat Rural District of the Central District in Qom County, Qom province, Iran.

== Demographics ==
=== Population ===
At the time of the 2006 National Census, the village's population was 291 in 72 households. The following census in 2011 counted 355 people in 107 households. The 2016 census measured the population of the village as 383 people in 116 households.
