= Hoseynabad-e Mish Mast =

Village in Qom province, Iran

Hoseynabad-e Mish Mast Persian: حسين ابادميش مست
- Village
- Location within Iran
- Coordinates: 34°27′25″N 51°09′55″E
- Country: Iran
- Province: Qom
- County: Qom
- District: Central
- Rural District: Qanavat

Population (2016)
  - Total: 1,311
- Time zone: UTC+3:30 (IRST)

Hoseynabad-e Mish Mast (Persian: حسين ابادميش مست) (Note: Also romanized as Ḩoseynābād-e Mīsh Mast; also known as Ḩasanābād-e Mīsh Mast, Ḩoseynābād, and Husainābād) is a village in Qanavat Rural District of the Central District in Qom County, Qom province, Iran.

== Demographics ==
=== Population ===
At the time of the 2006 National Census, the village's population was 1,066 in 260 households. The following census in 2011 counted 1,224 people in 342 households. The 2016 census measured the population of the village as 1,311 people in 378 households.
