= Zanburak =

Village in Qom province, Iran

Zanburak Persian: زنبورک
- Village
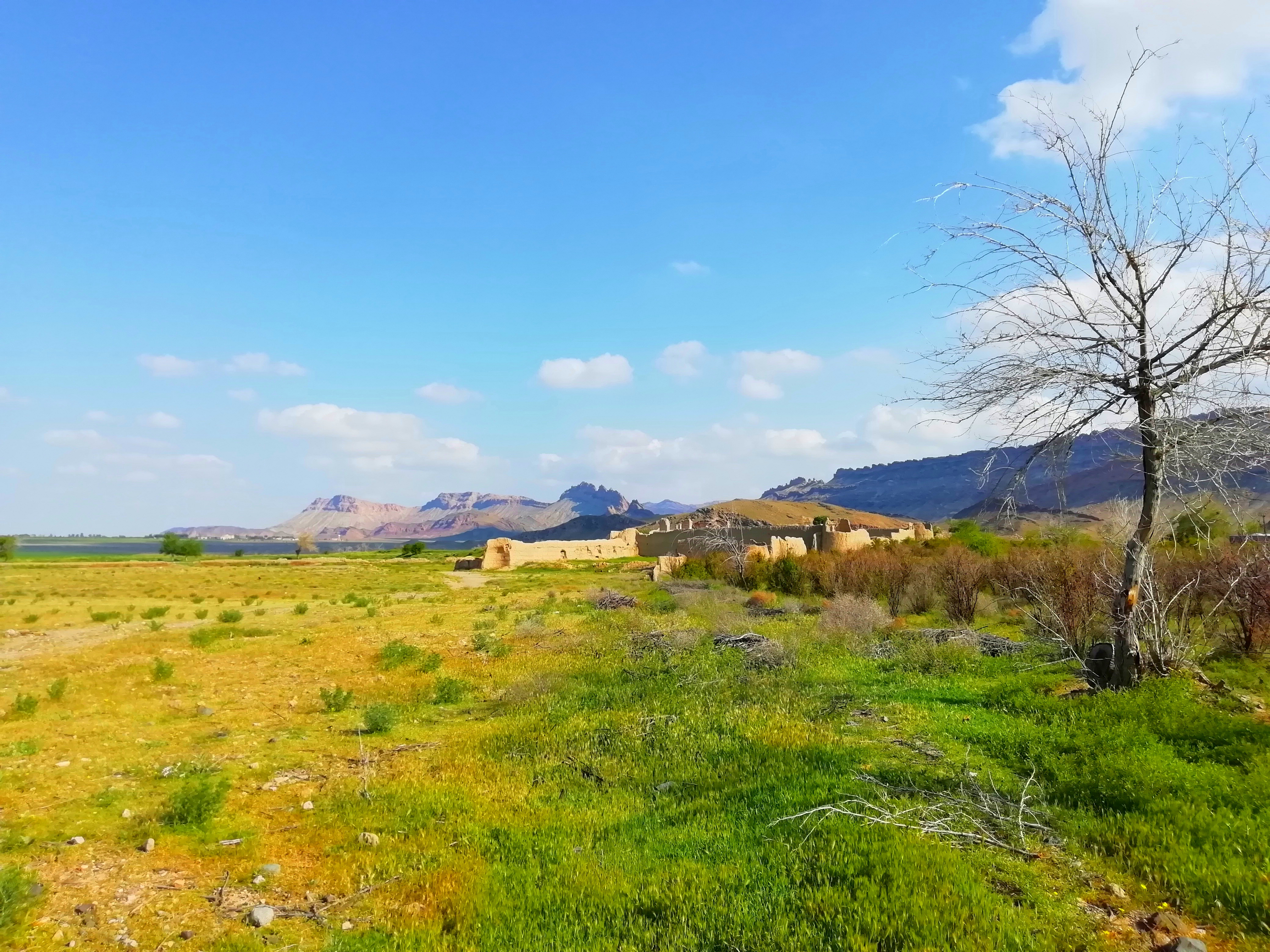
- The village of Zanburak

- Location within Iran
- Coordinates: 34°27′51″N 51°02′21″E
- Country: Iran
- Province: Qom
- County: Qom
- District: Central
- Rural District: Qanavat

Population (2016)
  - Total: 24
- Time zone: UTC+3:30 (IRST)

Zanburak (Persian: زنبورک) (Note: Also romanized as Zanbūrak) is a village in Qanavat Rural District of the Central District in Qom County, Qom province, Iran.

== Demographics ==
=== Population ===
At the time of the 2006 National Census, the village's population was 315 in 74 households. The following census in 2011 counted 29 people in five households. The 2016 census measured the population of the village as 24 people in eight households.
