= Mowmenabad, Qom =

Village in Qom province, Iran

Mowmenabad Persian: مومن اباد
- Village
- Location within Iran
- Coordinates: 34°36′21″N 51°03′38″E
- Country: Iran
- Province: Qom
- County: Qom
- District: Central
- Rural District: Qanavat

Population (2016)
  - Total: 924
- Time zone: UTC+3:30 (IRST)

Mowmenabad (Persian: مؤمن‌آباد) (Note: Also romanized as Mo’menābād and Mowmenābād) is a village in Qanavat Rural District of the Central District in Qom County, Qom province, Iran.

== Demographics ==
=== Population ===
At the time of the 2006 National Census, the village's population was 666 in 157 households. The following census in 2011 counted 774 people in 217 households. The 2016 census measured the population of the village as 924 people in 259 households.
