= Qanavat Rural District =

Rural district in Qom province, Iran

Qanavat Rural District Persian: دهستان قنوات
- Rural District
- Location within Iran
- Coordinates: 34°34′N 51°21′E
- Country: Iran
- Province: Qom
- County: Qom
- District: Central
- Established: 1987
- Capital: Hajjiabad-e Aqa

Population (2016)
  - Total: 15,617
- Time zone: UTC+3:30 (IRST)

Qanavat Rural District (Persian: دهستان قنوات) is in the Central District of Qom County, Qom province, Iran. Its capital is the village of Hajjiabad-e Aqa.

== Demographics ==
=== Population ===
At the time of the 2006 National Census, the rural district's population was 16,658 in 3,657 households. There were 13,529 inhabitants in 2,546 households at the following census of 2011. The 2016 census measured the population of the rural district as 15,617 in 3,355 households. The most populous of its 35 villages was Jannatabad, with 2,476 people.

=== Other villages in the rural district ===
- Dowlatabad-e Aqa
- Eslamabad
- Hoseynabad-e Mish Mast
- Langerud
- Mobarakabad
- Mowmenabad
- Navaran
- Sarajeh
- Shamsabad
- Zanburak
