= Eslamabad-e Bagh-e Nar =

Eslamabad-e Bagh-e Nar اسلام ابادباغ نار
- Village
- Location within Iran
- Coordinates: 30°23′18″N 50°48′37″E
- Country: Iran
- Province: Kohgiluyeh and Boyer-Ahmad
- County: Gachsaran
- Bakhsh: Central
- Rural District: Emamzadeh Jafar

Population (2006)
  - Total: 273
- Time zone: UTC+3:30 (IRST)
  - Summer (DST): UTC+4:30 (IRDT)

Eslamabad-e Bagh-e Nar (Persian: اسلام ابادباغ نار, also Romanized as Eslāmābād-e Bāgh-e Nār; also known as Eslāmābād) is a village in Emamzadeh Jafar Rural District, in the Central District of Gachsaran County, Kohgiluyeh and Boyer-Ahmad Province, Iran. At the 2006 census, its population was 273, in 55 families.
