= Shahrak-e Eslamabad, Sistan and Baluchestan =

Shahrak-e Eslamabad شهرك اسلام آباد
- Village
- Country: Iran
- Province: Sistan and Baluchestan
- County: Chabahar
- Bakhsh: Dashtiari
- Rural District: Negur

Population (2006)
  - Total: 185
- Time zone: UTC+3:30 (IRST)
  - Summer (DST): UTC+4:30 (IRDT)

Shahrak-e Eslamabad (Persian: شهرك اسلام آباد, also Romanized as Shahrak-e Eslāmābād) is a village in Negur Rural District, Dashtiari District, Chabahar County, Sistan and Baluchestan Province, Iran. At the 2006 census, its population was 185, in 26 families.
