= Eslamabad-e Ghurak =

Eslamabad-e Ghurak اسلام ابادغورك
- Village
- Location within Iran
- Coordinates: 30°16′30″N 51°11′09″E
- Country: Iran
- Province: Kohgiluyeh and Boyer-Ahmad
- County: Basht
- Bakhsh: Basht
- Rural District: Babuyi

Population (2006)
  - Total: 109
- Time zone: UTC+3:30 (IRST)
  - Summer (DST): UTC+4:30 (IRDT)

Eslamabad-e Ghurak (Persian: اسلام ابادغورك, also Romanized as Eslāmābād-e Ghūrak; also known as Eslāmābād) is a village in Babuyi Rural District, Basht District, Basht County, Kohgiluyeh and Boyer-Ahmad Province, Iran. At the 2006 census, its population was 109, in 21 families.
