= Eslamabad, Jahrom =

Eslamabad اسلام‌آباد
- Village
- Location within Iran
- Coordinates: 28°32′00″N 53°35′00″E
- Country: Iran
- Province: Fars
- County: Jahrom
- Bakhsh: Central
- Rural District: Jolgah

Population (2006)
  - Total: 997
- Time zone: UTC+3:30 (IRST)
  - Summer (DST): UTC+4:30 (IRDT)

Eslamabad (Persian: اسلام‌آباد, also Romanized as Eslāmābād) is a village in Jolgah Rural District, in the Central District of Jahrom County, Fars province, Iran. At the 2006 census, its population was 997, in 224 families.
