= Eslamabad-e Darshahi =

Eslamabad-e Darshahi اسلام اباددارشاهي
- Village
- Location within Iran
- Coordinates: 30°48′46″N 51°24′53″E
- Country: Iran
- Province: Kohgiluyeh and Boyer-Ahmad
- County: Dana
- Bakhsh: Central
- Rural District: Dana

Population (2006)
  - Total: 85
- Time zone: UTC+3:30 (IRST)
  - Summer (DST): UTC+4:30 (IRDT)

Eslamabad-e Darshahi (Persian: اسلام اباددارشاهي, also Romanized as Eslāmābād-e Dārshāhī; also known as Eslāmābād) is a village in Dana Rural District, in the Central District of Dana County, Kohgiluyeh and Boyer-Ahmad Province, Iran. At the 2006 census, its population was 85, in 14 families.
