= Eslamabad-e Heydarabad =

Eslamabad-e Heydarabad اسلام ابادحيدراباد
- Village
- Location within Iran
- Coordinates: 30°54′18″N 50°54′29″E
- Country: Iran
- Province: Kohgiluyeh and Boyer-Ahmad
- County: Boyer-Ahmad
- Bakhsh: Ludab
- Rural District: Ludab

Population (2006)
  - Total: 25
- Time zone: UTC+3:30 (IRST)
  - Summer (DST): UTC+4:30 (IRDT)

Eslamabad-e Heydarabad (Persian: اسلام ابادحيدراباد, also Romanized as Eslāmābād-e Ḩeydarābād; also known as Eslāmābād) is a village in Ludab Rural District, Ludab District, Boyer-Ahmad County, Kohgiluyeh and Boyer-Ahmad Province, Iran. At the 2006 census, its population was 25, in 5 families.
