= Eslamabad-e Dowlatabad =

Eslamabad-e Dowlatabad اسلام اباددولت اباد
- Village
- Location within Iran
- Coordinates: 30°13′48″N 56°35′11″E
- Country: Iran
- Province: Kerman
- County: Kerman
- Bakhsh: Central
- Rural District: Baghin

Population (2006)
  - Total: 91
- Time zone: UTC+3:30 (IRST)
  - Summer (DST): UTC+4:30 (IRDT)

Eslamabad-e Dowlatabad (Persian: اسلام اباددولت اباد, also Romanized as Eslāmābād-e Dowlatābād; also known as Eslāmābād) is a village in Baghin Rural District, in the Central District of Kerman County, Kerman Province, Iran. At the 2006 census, its population was 91, in 20 families.
