= Eslamabad-e 21 =

Eslamabad-e 21 اسلام اباد21
- Village
- Location within Iran
- Coordinates: 29°49′23″N 56°35′52″E
- Country: Iran
- Province: Kerman
- County: Bardsir
- Bakhsh: Central
- Rural District: Mashiz

Population (2006)
  - Total: 71
- Time zone: UTC+3:30 (IRST)
  - Summer (DST): UTC+4:30 (IRDT)

Eslamabad-e 21 (Persian: اسلام اباد21, also Romanized as Eslāmābād-e 21; also known as Eslāmābād) is a village in Mashiz Rural District, in the Central District of Bardsir County, Kerman Province, Iran. At the 2006 census, its population was 71, in 13 families.
