= Eslamabad, Kazerun =

Eslamabad (Shahsaltaneh) اسلام آباد (شاه سلطنه)
- Village
- Location within Iran
- Coordinates: 29°46′15″N 51°33′57″E
- Country: Iran
- Province: Fars
- County: Kazerun
- Bakhsh: Central
- Rural District: Shapur

Population (2006)
  - Total: 689
- Time zone: UTC+3:30 (IRST)
  - Summer (DST): UTC+4:30 (IRDT)

Eslamabad (Shahsaltaneh) (Persian: اسلام آباد (شاسلطنه), also Romanized as Eslāmābād) is a village in Shapur Rural District, in the Central District of Kazerun County, Fars province, Iran. At the 2006 census, its population was 689, in 134 families.
