= Eslamabad, Shahreza =

Eslamabad اسلام اباد
- Village
- Location within Iran
- Coordinates: 32°00′00″N 51°49′11″E
- Country: Iran
- Province: Isfahan
- County: Shahreza
- Bakhsh: Central
- Rural District: Manzariyeh

Population (2006)
  - Total: 4,489
- Time zone: UTC+3:30 (IRST)
  - Summer (DST): UTC+4:30 (IRDT)

Eslamabad (Persian: اسلام اباد, also Romanized as Eslāmābād) is a village in Manzariyeh Rural District, in the Central District of Shahreza County, Isfahan Province, Iran. At the 2006 census, its population was 4,489, in 997 families.
