= Eslamabad-e Jalil =

Eslamabad-e Jalil اسلام اباد جليل
- Village
- Location within Iran
- Coordinates: 30°39′35″N 51°15′20″E
- Country: Iran
- Province: Kohgiluyeh and Boyer-Ahmad
- County: Boyer-Ahmad
- Bakhsh: Central
- Rural District: Sepidar

Population (2006)
  - Total: 235
- Time zone: UTC+3:30 (IRST)
  - Summer (DST): UTC+4:30 (IRDT)

Eslamabad-e Jalil (Persian: اسلام اباد جليل, also Romanized as Eslāmābād-e Jalīl) is a village in Sepidar Rural District, in the Central District of Boyer-Ahmad County, Kohgiluyeh and Boyer-Ahmad Province, Iran. At the 2006 census, its population was 235, in 47 families.
