= Ghul Kal =

Ghul Kal غولكل
- Village
- Location within Iran
- Coordinates: 29°43′35″N 50°34′06″E
- Country: Iran
- Province: Bushehr
- County: Ganaveh
- Bakhsh: Central
- Rural District: Hayat Davud

Population (2006)
  - Total: 236
- Time zone: UTC+3:30 (IRST)
  - Summer (DST): UTC+4:30 (IRDT)

Ghul Kal (Persian: غولكل, also Romanized as Ghūl Kal; also known as Eslāmābād) is a village in Hayat Davud Rural District, in the Central District of Ganaveh County, Bushehr Province, Iran. At the 2006 census, its population was 236, in 51 families.
