= Eslamabad, Qatruyeh =

Eslamabad اسلام اباد
- Village
- Location within Iran
- Coordinates: 28°57′37″N 54°52′05″E
- Country: Iran
- Province: Fars
- County: Neyriz
- Bakhsh: Qatruyeh
- Rural District: Rizab

Population (2006)
  - Total: 127
- Time zone: UTC+3:30 (IRST)
  - Summer (DST): UTC+4:30 (IRDT)

Eslamabad (Persian: اسلام اباد, also Romanized as Eslāmābād; also known as Eslāmābād-e Kamālī) is a village in Rizab Rural District, Qatruyeh District, Neyriz County, Fars province, Iran. At the 2006 census, its population was 127, in 34 families.
