= Eslamabad-e Javid =

Eslamabad-e Javid اسلام ابادجاويد
- Village
- Location within Iran
- Coordinates: 30°10′51″N 51°37′34″E
- Country: Iran
- Province: Fars
- County: Mamasani
- Bakhsh: Central
- Rural District: Javid-e Mahuri

Population (2006)
  - Total: 255
- Time zone: UTC+3:30 (IRST)
  - Summer (DST): UTC+4:30 (IRDT)

Eslamabad-e Javid (Persian: اسلام ابادجاويد, also Romanized as Eslāmābād-e Jāvīd; also known as Eslāmābād) is a village in Javid-e Mahuri Rural District, in the Central District of Mamasani County, Fars province, Iran. At the 2006 census, its population was 255, in 48 families.
