= Eslamabad-e Chehel Cheshmeh =

Eslamabad-e Chehel Cheshmeh اسلام ابادچهل چشمه
- Village
- Location within Iran
- Coordinates: 29°44′20″N 52°03′10″E
- Country: Iran
- Province: Fars
- County: Shiraz
- Bakhsh: Arzhan
- Rural District: Qarah Chaman

Population (2006)
  - Total: 127
- Time zone: UTC+3:30 (IRST)
  - Summer (DST): UTC+4:30 (IRDT)

Eslamabad-e Chehel Cheshmeh (Persian: اسلام ابادچهل چشمه, also Romanized as Eslāmābād-e Chehel Cheshmeh) is a village in Qarah Chaman Rural District, Arzhan District, Shiraz County, Fars province, Iran. At the 2006 census, its population was 127, in 21 families.
