= Eslamabad-e Garnechin =

Eslamabad-e Garnechin اسلام ابادگرنچين
- Village
- Location within Iran
- Coordinates: 28°08′44″N 61°29′15″E
- Country: Iran
- Province: Sistan and Baluchestan
- County: Khash
- Bakhsh: Central
- Rural District: Kuh Sefid

Population (2006)
  - Total: 741
- Time zone: UTC+3:30 (IRST)
  - Summer (DST): UTC+4:30 (IRDT)

Eslamabad-e Garnechin (Persian: اسلام ابادگرنچين, also Romanized as Eslāmābād-e Garnechīn; also known as Eslāmābād) is a village in Kuh Sefid Rural District, in the Central District of Khash County, Sistan and Baluchestan Province, Iran. At the 2006 census, its population was 741, in 158 families.
