= Eslamabad Rural District =

Eslamabad Rural District (Persian: دهستان اسلام آباد) may refer to:

- Eslamabad Rural District (Parsabad County), in Ardabil Province
- Eslamabad Rural District (Rasht County), in Gilan Province
- Eslamabad Rural District (Rudan County), in Hormozgan Province
- Eslamabad Rural District (Jiroft County), in Kerman Province
- Eslamabad Rural District (Zarand County), in Kerman Province
