= Eslamabad, Dehaj =

Eslamabad اسلام اباد
- Village
- Country: Iran
- Province: Kerman
- County: Shahr-e Babak
- Bakhsh: Dehaj
- Rural District: Khabar

Population (2006)
  - Total: 56
- Time zone: UTC+3:30 (IRST)
  - Summer (DST): UTC+4:30 (IRDT)

Eslamabad (Persian: اسلام اباد, also Romanized as Eslāmābād) is a village in Khabar Rural District, Dehaj District, Shahr-e Babak County, Kerman Province, Iran. At the 2006 census, its population was 56, in 6 families.
