= Shad Kandi =

Shad Kandi شادكندي
- Village
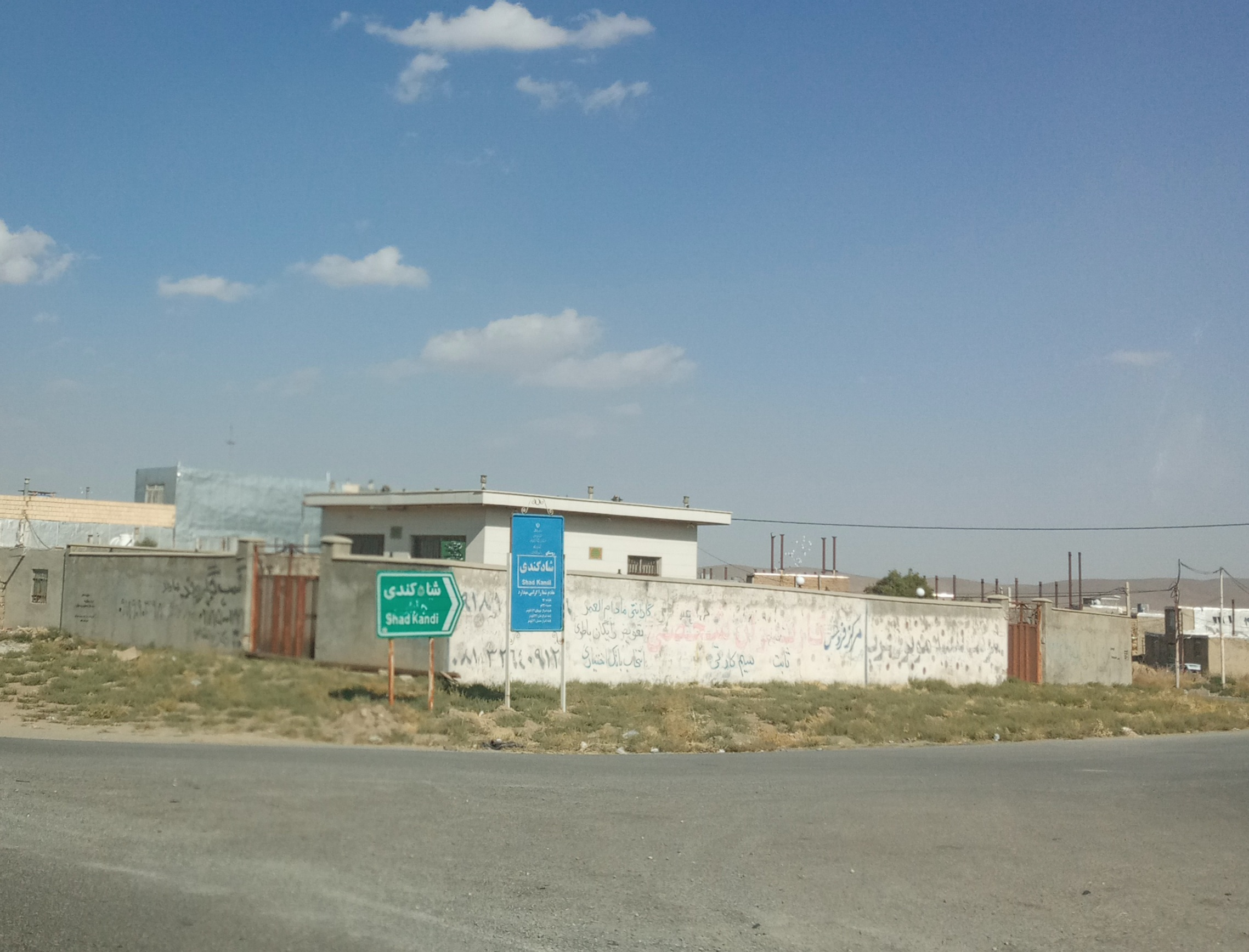
- Shad Kandi is a village in Hamadan Province, Iran

- Location within Iran
- Coordinates: 34°38′59″N 48°47′42″E
- Country: Iran
- Province: Hamadan
- County: Malayer
- Bakhsh: Jowkar
- Rural District: Tork-e Gharbi

Population (2006)
  - Total: 293
- Time zone: UTC+3:30 (IRST)
  - Summer (DST): UTC+4:30 (IRDT)

Shad Kandi (Persian: شادكندي, also Romanized as Shād Kandī; also known as Eslāmābād and Shāh Kandī) is a village in Tork-e Gharbi Rural District, Jowkar District, Malayer County, Hamadan Province, Iran. At the 2006 census, its population was 293, in 64 families.
