= Eslamabad-e Darvish Khanka =

Eslamabad-e Darvish Khanka اسلام اباددرويش خانكا
- Village
- Location within Iran
- Coordinates: 28°05′58″N 57°16′15″E
- Country: Iran
- Province: Kerman
- County: Faryab
- Bakhsh: Central
- Rural District: Golashkerd

Population (2006)
  - Total: 40
- Time zone: UTC+3:30 (IRST)
  - Summer (DST): UTC+4:30 (IRDT)

Eslamabad-e Darvish Khanka (Persian: اسلام اباددرويش خانكا, also Romanized as Eslāmābād-e Darvīsh Khānkā; also known as Eslāmābād) is a village located in Golashkerd Rural District, within the Central District of Faryab County, Kerman Province, Iran. According to the 2006 census, the village had a population of 40 individuals, residing in 9 families.
