= Eslamabad-e Tang Shib =

Eslamabad-e Tang Shib اسلام ابادتنگ شيب
- Village
- Country: Iran
- Province: Fars
- County: Kazerun
- Bakhsh: Kuhmareh
- Rural District: Kuhmareh

Population (2006)
  - Total: 110
- Time zone: UTC+3:30 (IRST)
  - Summer (DST): UTC+4:30 (IRDT)

Eslamabad-e Tang Shib (Persian: اسلام ابادتنگ شيب, also Romanized as Eslāmābād-e Tang Shīb) is a village in Kuhmareh Rural District, Kuhmareh District, Kazerun County, Fars province, Iran. At the 2006 census, its population was 110, in 28 families.
