= Eslamabad-e Sar Meydan =

Eslamabad-e Sar Meydan اسلام ابادسرميدان
- Village
- Location within Iran
- Coordinates: 26°56′25″N 58°45′32″E
- Country: Iran
- Province: Kerman
- County: Qaleh Ganj
- Bakhsh: Chah Dadkhoda
- Rural District: Rameshk

Population (2006)
  - Total: 133
- Time zone: UTC+3:30 (IRST)
  - Summer (DST): UTC+4:30 (IRDT)

Eslamabad-e Sar Meydan (Persian: اسلام ابادسرميدان, also Romanized as Eslāmābād-e Sar Meydān; also known as Eslāmābād) is a village in Rameshk Rural District, Chah Dadkhoda District, Qaleh Ganj County, Kerman Province, Iran. At the 2006 census, its population was 133, in 30 families.
