= Eslamabad (1) =

Eslamabad (1) اسلام اباد (1)
- Village
- Location within Iran
- Coordinates: 27°32′14″N 57°53′36″E
- Country: Iran
- Province: Kerman
- County: Manujan
- Bakhsh: Central
- Rural District: Qaleh

Population (2006)
  - Total: 102
- Time zone: UTC+3:30 (IRST)
  - Summer (DST): UTC+4:30 (IRDT)

Eslamabad (1) (Persian: اسلام اباد (1), also Romanized as Eslāmābād (1); also known as Eslāmābād) is a village in Qaleh Rural District, in the Central District of Manujan County, Kerman Province, Iran. At the 2006 census, its population was 102, in 23 families.
