= Rig Sefid, Dehpir-e Shomali =

Rig Sefid ريگ سفيد
- Village
- Location within Iran
- Coordinates: 33°31′53″N 48°30′10″E
- Country: Iran
- Province: Lorestan
- County: Khorramabad
- Bakhsh: Central
- Rural District: Dehpir-e Shomali

Population (2006)
  - Total: 173
- Time zone: UTC+3:30 (IRST)
  - Summer (DST): UTC+4:30 (IRDT)

Rig Sefid (Persian: ريگ سفيد, also Romanized as Rīg Sefīd; also known as Rokh-e Sefīd) is a village in Dehpir-e Shomali Rural District, in the Central District of Khorramabad County, Lorestan Province, Iran. At the 2006 census, its population was 173, in 41 families.
