= Eslamabad, Saqqez =

Eslamabad اسلام آباد
- Village
- Location within Iran
- Coordinates: 36°13′46″N 46°13′45″E
- Country: Iran
- Province: Kurdistan
- County: Saqqez
- Bakhsh: Central
- Rural District: Tamugheh

Population (2006)
  - Total: 188
- Time zone: UTC+3:30 (IRST)
  - Summer (DST): UTC+4:30 (IRDT)

Eslamabad (Persian: اسلام آباد, also Romanized as Eslāmābād) is a village in Tamugheh Rural District, in the Central District of Saqqez County, Kurdistan Province, Iran. At the 2006 census, its population was 188, in 44 families. The village is populated by Kurds.
