= Eslamabad-e Lakazi =

Eslamabad-e Lakazi اسلام ابادلكزي
- Village
- Location within Iran
- Coordinates: 36°10′53″N 58°51′32″E
- Country: Iran
- Province: Razavi Khorasan
- County: Nishapur
- Bakhsh: Central
- Rural District: Fazl

Population (2006)
  - Total: 453
- Time zone: UTC+3:30 (IRST)
  - Summer (DST): UTC+4:30 (IRDT)

Eslamabad-e Lakazi (Persian: اسلام ابادلكزي, also romanized as Eslāmābād-e Laḵazī; also known as Eslāmābād and Shāhābād) is a village in Fazl Rural District, in the Central District of Nishapur County, Razavi Khorasan Province, Iran. At the 2006 census, its population was 453, in 140 families.
