= Islampur, Ratnagiri district =

Village in Ratnagiri district, Maharashtra, India

- Village in Maharashtra
- Location in Maharashtra, India
- Coordinates: 18.0471°N 73.2815°E
- Country: India
- State: Maharashtra
- District: Ratnagiri

Area
  - Total: 1.3838 km^{2} (0.5343 sq mi)

Population (2011)
  - Total: 1,474
  - Density: 1,065/km^{2} (2,759/sq mi)

Language
  - Official: Marathi
- Time zone: UTC+5:30 (IST)

Islampur is a small village in Ratnagiri district, Maharashtra state in Western India. The 2011 Census of India said that its area was 1.3838 square kilometres (0.5343 sq mi), and had a population of 1,474 living in 267 households.
