= Eslamabad, Haftkel =

Eslamabad اسلام اباد
- Village
- Location within Iran
- Coordinates: 31°27′12″N 49°31′37″E
- Country: Iran
- Province: Khuzestan
- County: Haftgel
- Bakhsh: Raghiveh
- Rural District: Gazin

Population (2006)
  - Total: 94
- Time zone: UTC+3:30 (IRST)
  - Summer (DST): UTC+4:30 (IRDT)

Eslamabad (Persian: اسلام اباد, also Romanized as Eslāmābād) is a village in Gazin Rural District, Raghiveh District, Haftgel County, Khuzestan Province, Iran. At the 2006 census, its population was 94, in 16 families.
