= Eslamabad-e Kahur Khoshk =

Eslamabad-e Kahur Khoshk اسلام اباد كهور خشك
- Village
- Location within Iran
- Coordinates: 28°42′35″N 58°59′26″E
- Country: Iran
- Province: Kerman
- County: Rigan
- Bakhsh: Gonbaki
- Rural District: Gonbaki

Population (2006)
  - Total: 182
- Time zone: UTC+3:30 (IRST)
  - Summer (DST): UTC+4:30 (IRDT)

Eslamabad-e Kahur Khoshk (Persian: اسلام اباد كهور خشك, also Romanized as Eslāmābād-e Kahūr Khoshk) is a village in Gonbaki Rural District, Gonbaki District, Rigan County, Kerman Province, Iran. At the 2006 census, its population was 182, in 41 families.
