= Eslamabad, Behbahan =

Eslamabad اسلام اباد
- Village
- Location within Iran
- Coordinates: 30°22′21″N 50°08′52″E
- Country: Iran
- Province: Khuzestan
- County: Behbahan
- Bakhsh: Zeydun
- Rural District: Sardasht

Population (2006)
  - Total: 417
- Time zone: UTC+3:30 (IRST)
  - Summer (DST): UTC+4:30 (IRDT)

Eslamabad (Persian: اسلام اباد, also Romanized as Eslāmābād) is a village in Sardasht Rural District, Zeydun District, Behbahan County, Khuzestan Province, Iran. At the 2006 census, its population was 417, in 85 families.
