= Eslamabad-e Tang Sorkh =

Eslamabad-e Tang Sorkh اسلام ابادتنگ سرخ
- Village
- Location within Iran
- Coordinates: 30°29′34″N 51°44′14″E
- Country: Iran
- Province: Kohgiluyeh and Boyer-Ahmad
- County: Boyer-Ahmad
- Bakhsh: Central
- Rural District: Sarrud-e Jonubi

Population (2006)
  - Total: 47
- Time zone: UTC+3:30 (IRST)
  - Summer (DST): UTC+4:30 (IRDT)

Eslamabad-e Tang Sorkh (Persian: اسلام ابادتنگ سرخ, also Romanized as Eslāmābād-e Tang Sorkh; also known as Eslāmābād) is a village in Sarrud-e Jonubi Rural District, in the Central District of Boyer-Ahmad County, Kohgiluyeh and Boyer-Ahmad Province, Iran. At the 2006 census, its population was 47, in 9 families.
