= Eslamabad Barg Beydi =

Eslamabad Barg Beydi اسلام آباد برگ بيدي
- Village
- Location within Iran
- Coordinates: 33°29′19″N 48°47′10″E
- Country: Iran
- Province: Lorestan
- County: Khorramabad
- Bakhsh: Bayravand
- Rural District: Beyranvand-e Jonubi

Population (2006)
  - Total: 19
- Time zone: UTC+3:30 (IRST)
  - Summer (DST): UTC+4:30 (IRDT)

Eslamabad Barg Beydi (Persian: اسلام آباد برگ بيدي, also Romanized as Eslāmābād Barg Beydī; also known as Eslāmābād) is a village in Beyranvand-e Jonubi Rural District, Bayravand District, Khorramabad County, Lorestan Province, Iran. At the 2006 census, its population was 19, in 6 families.
