= Kalleh-ye Espid-e Eslamabad =

Kalleh-ye Espid-e Eslamabad كله اسپيداسلام اباد
- Village
- Location within Iran
- Coordinates: 28°15′48″N 60°35′20″E
- Country: Iran
- Province: Sistan and Baluchestan
- County: Khash
- Bakhsh: Nukabad
- Rural District: Gowhar Kuh

Population (2006)
  - Total: 135
- Time zone: UTC+3:30 (IRST)
  - Summer (DST): UTC+4:30 (IRDT)

Kalleh-ye Espid-e Eslamabad (Persian: كله اسپيداسلام اباد, also Romanized as Kalleh-ye Espīd-e Eslāmābād; also known as Eslāmābād) is a village in Gowhar Kuh Rural District, Nukabad District, Khash County, Sistan and Baluchestan Province, Iran. At the 2006 census, its population was 135, in 29 families.
