= Pay-ye Qaleh =

Pay-ye Qaleh پاي قلعه
- Village
- Location within Iran
- Coordinates: 32°37′00″N 48°30′49″E
- Country: Iran
- Province: Khuzestan
- County: Dezful
- Bakhsh: Sardasht
- Rural District: Shahi

Population (2006)
  - Total: 172
- Time zone: UTC+3:30 (IRST)
  - Summer (DST): UTC+4:30 (IRDT)

Pay-ye Qaleh (Persian: پاي قلعه, also Romanized as Pāy-ye Qāl‘eh; also known as Eslāmābād (Persian: اسلام اباد), Pā Qal‘eh-ye Shādāb, and Pāyeh Qal‘eh) is a village in Shahi Rural District, Sardasht District, Dezful County, Khuzestan Province, Iran. At the 2006 census, its population was 172, in 38 families.
