= Eslamabad, Qanavat =

Village in Qom province, Iran

Eslamabad Persian: اسلام اباد
- Village
- Location within Iran
- Coordinates: 34°37′51″N 51°00′29″E
- Country: Iran
- Province: Qom
- County: Qom
- District: Central
- Rural District: Qanavat

Population (2016)
  - Total: 799
- Time zone: UTC+3:30 (IRST)

Eslamabad (Persian: اسلام اباد) (Note: Also romanized as Eslāmābād) is a village in Qanavat Rural District of the Central District in Qom County, Qom province, Iran.

== Demographics ==
=== Population ===
At the time of the 2006 National Census, the village's population was 452 in 101 households. The following census in 2011 counted 680 people in 182 households. The 2016 census measured the population of the village as 799 people in 230 households.
