= Eslamabad, Jereh =

Eslamabad اسلام اباد
- Village
- Location within Iran
- Coordinates: 29°19′09″N 51°59′26″E
- Country: Iran
- Province: Fars
- County: Kazerun
- Bakhsh: Jereh and Baladeh
- Rural District: Jereh

Population (2006)
  - Total: 232
- Time zone: UTC+3:30 (IRST)
  - Summer (DST): UTC+4:30 (IRDT)

Eslamabad (Persian: اسلام اباد, also Romanized as Eslāmābād; also known as Eslāmābād-e Balūch) is a village in Jereh Rural District, Jereh and Baladeh District, Kazerun County, Fars province, Iran. At the 2006 census, its population was 232, in 48 families.
