= Eslamabad-e Yek, Kerman =

Eslamabad-e Yek اسلام آباديك
- Village
- Location within Iran
- Coordinates: 28°58′31″N 56°32′30″E
- Country: Iran
- Province: Kerman
- County: Baft
- Bakhsh: Central
- Rural District: Dashtab

Population (2006)
  - Total: 262
- Time zone: UTC+3:30 (IRST)
  - Summer (DST): UTC+4:30 (IRDT)

Eslamabad-e Yek (Persian: اسلام آباديك, also Romanized as Eslāmābād-e Yek; also known as Eslāmābād) is a village in Dashtab Rural District, in the Central District of Baft County, Kerman Province, Iran. At the 2006 census, its population was 262, in 49 families.
