= Dul Kor =

Dul Kor دول كر
- Village
- Location within Iran
- Coordinates: 35°02′58″N 46°55′50″E
- Country: Iran
- Province: Kurdistan
- County: Kamyaran
- Bakhsh: Muchesh
- Rural District: Avalan

Population (2006)
  - Total: 202
- Time zone: UTC+3:30 (IRST)
  - Summer (DST): UTC+4:30 (IRDT)

Dul Kor (Persian: دول كر, also Romanized as Dūl Kor; also known as Delkorū, Dolkorū, Dūl Korū, and Eslāmābād) is a village in Avalan Rural District, Muchesh District, Kamyaran County, Kurdistan Province, Iran. At the 2006 census, its population was 202, in 63 families. The village is populated by Kurds.
