= Eslamabad (2) =

Eslamabad (2) اسلام اباد (2)
- Village
- Location within Iran
- Coordinates: 27°16′18″N 57°52′20″E
- Country: Iran
- Province: Kerman
- County: Manujan
- Bakhsh: Central
- Rural District: Qaleh

Population (2006)
  - Total: 172
- Time zone: UTC+3:30 (IRST)
  - Summer (DST): UTC+4:30 (IRDT)

Eslamabad (2) (Persian: اسلام اباد (2), also Romanized as Eslāmābād (2); also known as Eslāmābād and Gashūlak) is a village in Qaleh Rural District, in the Central District of Manujan County, Kerman Province, Iran. At the 2006 census, its population was 172, in 32 families.
