= Shah Nil =

Shah Nil شاه نيل
- Village
- Location within Iran
- Coordinates: 36°28′11″N 59°28′08″E
- Country: Iran
- Province: Razavi Khorasan
- County: Mashhad
- Bakhsh: Central
- Rural District: Tus

Population (2006)
  - Total: 152
- Time zone: UTC+3:30 (IRST)
  - Summer (DST): UTC+4:30 (IRDT)

Shah Nil (Persian: شاه نيل, also Romanized as Shāh Nīl; also known as Eslāmābād) is a village in Tus Rural District, in the Central District of Mashhad County, Razavi Khorasan Province, Iran. At the 2006 census, its population was 152, in 38 families.
