= Eslamabad-e Khalaj =

Eslamabad-e Khalaj اسلام ابادخلج
- Village
- Location within Iran
- Coordinates: 35°36′04″N 59°24′24″E
- Country: Iran
- Province: Razavi Khorasan
- County: Torbat-e Heydarieh
- Bakhsh: Jolgeh Rokh
- Rural District: Pain Rokh

Population (2006)
  - Total: 266
- Time zone: UTC+3:30 (IRST)
  - Summer (DST): UTC+4:30 (IRDT)

Eslamabad-e Khalaj (Persian: اسلام ابادخلج, also Romanized as Eslāmābād-e Khalaj) is a village in Pain Rokh Rural District, Jolgeh Rokh District, Torbat-e Heydarieh County, Razavi Khorasan Province, Iran. At the 2006 census, its population was 266, in 62 families.
