= Eslamabad, Eqlid =

Eslamabad اسلام اباد
- Village
- Location within Iran
- Coordinates: 30°29′25″N 52°14′15″E
- Country: Iran
- Province: Fars
- County: Eqlid
- Bakhsh: Hasanabad
- Rural District: Bakan

Population (2006)
  - Total: 338
- Time zone: UTC+3:30 (IRST)
  - Summer (DST): UTC+4:30 (IRDT)

Eslamabad (Persian: اسلام اباد, also Romanized as Eslāmābād) is a village in Bakan Rural District, Hasanabad District, Eqlid County, Fars province, Iran. At the 2006 census, its population was 338, in 72 families.
