= Eslamabad, Kiar =

Eslamabad اسلام اباد
- Village
- Location within Iran
- Coordinates: 32°05′07″N 50°47′02″E
- Country: Iran
- Province: Chaharmahal and Bakhtiari
- County: Kiar
- Bakhsh: Central
- Rural District: Kiar-e Gharbi

Population (2006)
  - Total: 117
- Time zone: UTC+3:30 (IRST)
  - Summer (DST): UTC+4:30 (IRDT)

Eslamabad (Persian: اسلام اباد, also Romanized as Eslāmābād) is a village in Kiar-e Gharbi Rural District, in the Central District of Kiar County, Chaharmahal and Bakhtiari Province, Iran. At the 2006 census, its population was 117, in 33 families. The village is populated by Lurs.
