= Eslamabad, Bakhtajerd =

Eslamabad اسلام اباد
- Village
- Location within Iran
- Coordinates: 28°43′55″N 54°24′54″E
- Country: Iran
- Province: Fars
- County: Darab
- Bakhsh: Central
- Rural District: Bakhtajerd

Population (2006)
  - Total: 1,028
- Time zone: UTC+3:30 (IRST)
  - Summer (DST): UTC+4:30 (IRDT)

Eslamabad (Persian: اسلام اباد, also Romanized as Eslāmābād) is a village in Bakhtajerd Rural District, in the Central District of Darab County, Fars province, Iran. At the 2006 census, its population was 1,028, in 241 families.
