= Eslamabad-e Tang Seh Riz =

Eslamabad-e Tang Seh Riz اسلام اباد تنگ سه ريز
- Village
- Location within Iran
- Coordinates: 30°45′05″N 51°29′41″E
- Country: Iran
- Province: Kohgiluyeh and Boyer-Ahmad
- County: Boyer-Ahmad
- Bakhsh: Central
- Rural District: Sarrud-e Shomali

Population (2006)
  - Total: 180
- Time zone: UTC+3:30 (IRST)
  - Summer (DST): UTC+4:30 (IRDT)

Eslamabad-e Tang Seh Riz (Persian: اسلام اباد تنگ سه ريز, also Romanized as Eslāmābād-e Tang Seh Rīz; also known as Eslāmābād) is a village in Sarrud-e Shomali Rural District, in the Central District of Boyer-Ahmad County, Kohgiluyeh and Boyer-Ahmad Province, Iran. At the 2006 census, its population was 180, in 43 families.
