= Meymuneh =

Meymuneh ميمونه
- Village
- Location within Iran
- Coordinates: 32°01′47″N 54°07′25″E
- Country: Iran
- Province: Yazd
- County: Saduq
- Bakhsh: Central
- Rural District: Rostaq

Population (2006)
  - Total: 1,072
- Time zone: UTC+3:30 (IRST)
  - Summer (DST): UTC+4:30 (IRDT)

Meymuneh (Persian: ميمونه, also Romanized as Meymūneh and Meimooneh; also known as Eslāmābād, Maimanen, Maimūn, and Meymūn) is a village in Rostaq Rural District, in the Central District of Saduq County, Yazd Province, Iran. At the 2006 census, its population was 1,072, in 286 families.
