= Eslamabad-e Nazmakan =

Eslamabad-e Nazmakan اسلام ابادنازمكان
- Village
- Location within Iran
- Coordinates: 30°38′33″N 50°46′16″E
- Country: Iran
- Province: Kohgiluyeh and Boyer-Ahmad
- County: Gachsaran
- Bakhsh: Central
- Rural District: Boyer Ahmad-e Garmsiri

Population (2006)
  - Total: 28
- Time zone: UTC+3:30 (IRST)
  - Summer (DST): UTC+4:30 (IRDT)

Eslamabad-e Nazmakan (Persian: اسلام ابادنازمكان, also Romanized as Eslāmābād-e Nāzmakān; also known as Eslāmābād) is a village in Boyer Ahmad-e Garmsiri Rural District, in the Central District of Gachsaran County, Kohgiluyeh and Boyer-Ahmad Province, Iran. At the 2006 census, its population was 28, in 7 families.
