= Islamabad Union, Matlab North =

Islamabad Union ইসলামাবাদ ইউনিয়ন
- Union Council
- No. 13 Islamabad Union Council
- Country: Bangladesh
- Division: Chittagong Division
- District: Chandpur District
- Upazila: North Matlab Upazila

Government
  - Chairman: Sajedul Hasan

Population
  - Total: 14,832
- Demonym: Islamabadi
- Time zone: UTC+6 (BST)
- Website: islamabadup.chandpur.gov.bd

Islamabad Union Council (Bengali: ইসলামাবাদ ইউনিয়ন পরিষদ) is a Union Parishad under North Matlab Upazila of Chandpur District in the Chittagong Division of Bangladesh. It has an area of 12.8 square kilometres and a population of 14,832.

== Geography ==
Islamabad Union is located in the North Matlab Upazila. It borders West Panchgachia (Daudkandi Upazila) in the west, Sultanabad Union in the south and Durgapur Union in the north. It has an area of 14.7 square kilometres.

== History ==
The Islamabad and Sultanabad unions of North Matlab were formerly part of one union council known as Islampur. After 1965, Islampur was partitioned into these two separate union councils. The name of Islampur was changed to No. 15 Islamabad Union Council to honour and match with the name of the capital city of Pakistan, which the union council was then a part of. After the Partition of Matlab, No. 15 Islamabad Union Council became No. 13 Islamabad Union Council.

== Demography ==
Islamabad has a population of 14,832.

== Administration ==
Islamabad constitutes the no. 13 union council of North Matlab Upazila. It contains 13 villages contained into nine wards:

1. Titarkandi
2. Titarkandi, Char Shivpur, Shivpur
3. Shivpur, Nandalalpur, Satbaria
4. Shujatpur
5. Shujatpur
6. Lamchari, Jangal Islamabad, West Shujatpur
7. Raipur Islamabad, West Islamabad
8. Middle Islamabad and East Islamabad
9. East Islamabad

=== List of chairmen ===
Name	Term	Notes
Lutfe Ali Sarkar	1965-	
Abdur Rahman Sarkar		
Ali Husayn Kerani	– 1973	
Muhammad Rajjab Ali Munshi	1973 - 1978	
Muhammad Amir Husayn Miyanji	1978-1988	
Shah Muhammad Al-Amin Sarkar	1988-1992	
Muhammad Abdul Quddus Munshi	1992-1998	
Shah Muhammad Al-Amin Sarkar	1998-2004	Second term
Muhammad Abdul Quddus Munshi	2004-2008	Second term
Ali Husayn Bhuiyan	2008-2011	Acting
Sajedul Hasan Babu Baten	2011-2021	

== Economy and tourism ==
Islamabad has hundreds of expatriates in Saudi Arabia, UAE, Bahrain, Oman, Qatar, Kuwait, Maldives, Malaysia, Singapore, Italy, and the United States contributing to its economy. It has many Haat bazaarsmost famously the Nandalalpur Bazar.

== Education and culture ==
The Union has 10 primary schools and 2 high schools. There are 33 mosques and at least four madrasas. There are six orphanages in Islamabad: East Islamabad Orphanage, Shujatpur Habibiyyah Nurani Madrasah & Orphanage, Shujatpur Dervish Bari Madrasah & Orphanage, Al-Aqsa Jame Mosque and Orphanage, Bayt al-Amin Jame Mosque Ayn al-Din Sarkar Bari Orphanage and the Nandalalpu-Satbaria Madrasah & Orphanage. Islamabadis converse in their native Comillan dialect but can also converse in Standard Bengali. Languages such as Arabic and English are also taught in schools. The Union contains many mosques and eidgahs.
