= Langerud, Qom =

Village in Qom province, Iran

Langerud Persian: لنگرود
- Village
- Location within Iran
- Coordinates: 34°31′33″N 50°58′44″E
- Country: Iran
- Province: Qom
- County: Qom
- District: Central
- Rural District: Qanavat

Population (2016)
  - Total: 2,293
- Time zone: UTC+3:30 (IRST)

Langerud (Persian: لنگرود) (Note: Also romanized as Langarūd, Langerūd, and Langrūd; also known as Langrūn and Lankarūd) is a village in Qanavat Rural District of the Central District in Qom County, Qom province, Iran.

== Demographics ==
=== Population ===
At the time of the 2006 National Census, the village's population was 1,574 in 353 households. The following census in 2011 counted 1,815 people in 441 households. The 2016 census measured the population of the village as 2,293 people in 586 households.
