= Eslamabad, Bagh-e Malek =

Eslamabad اسلام اباد
- Village
- Location within Iran
- Coordinates: 31°34′34″N 49°38′10″E
- Country: Iran
- Province: Khuzestan
- County: Bagh-e Malek
- Bakhsh: Central
- Rural District: Rud Zard

Population (2006)
  - Total: 42
- Time zone: UTC+3:30 (IRST)
  - Summer (DST): UTC+4:30 (IRDT)

Eslamabad (Persian: اسلام اباد, also Romanized as Eslāmābād; also known as Eslāmābād-e Shāh Neshīn and Shāh Neshīn) is a village in Rud Zard Rural District, in the Central District of Bagh-e Malek County, Khuzestan Province, Iran. At the 2006 census, its population was 42, in 10 families.
