= Eslamabad-e Baba Ahmad =

Eslamabad-e Baba Ahmad اسلام ابادبابااحمد
- Village
- Location within Iran
- Coordinates: 30°59′29″N 50°00′09″E
- Country: Iran
- Province: Kohgiluyeh and Boyer-Ahmad
- County: Bahmai
- Bakhsh: Central
- Rural District: Bahmai-ye Garmsiri-ye Jonubi

Population (2006)
  - Total: 276
- Time zone: UTC+3:30 (IRST)
  - Summer (DST): UTC+4:30 (IRDT)

Eslamabad-e Baba Ahmad (Persian: اسلام ابادبابااحمد, also Romanized as Eslāmābād-e Bābā Aḩmad; also known as Eslāmābād) is a village in Bahmai-ye Garmsiri-ye Jonubi Rural District, in the Central District of Bahmai County, Kohgiluyeh and Boyer-Ahmad Province, Iran. At the 2006 census, its population was 276, in 50 families.
