= Eslamabad-e Ghani =

Eslamabad-e Ghani اسلام ابادغني
- Village
- Country: Iran
- Province: Fars
- County: Darab
- Bakhsh: Central
- Rural District: Bakhtajerd

Population (2006)
  - Total: 64
- Time zone: UTC+3:30 (IRST)
  - Summer (DST): UTC+4:30 (IRDT)

Eslamabad-e Ghani (Persian: اسلام ابادغني, also Romanized as Eslāmābād-e Ghanī) is a village in Bakhtajerd Rural District, in the Central District of Darab County, Fars province, Iran. At the 2006 census, its population was 64, in 19 families.
