= Gari Eslamabad =

Gari Eslamabad گري اسلام آباد
- Village
- Location within Iran
- Coordinates: 33°33′23″N 46°55′06″E
- Country: Iran
- Province: Lorestan
- County: Kuhdasht
- Bakhsh: Kunani
- Rural District: Zirtang

Population (2006)
  - Total: 64
- Time zone: UTC+3:30 (IRST)
  - Summer (DST): UTC+4:30 (IRDT)

Gari Eslamabad (Persian: گري اسلام آباد, also Romanized as Garī Eslāmābād; also known as Eslāmābād) is a village in Zirtang Rural District, Kunani District, Kuhdasht County, Lorestan Province, Iran. At the 2006 census, its population was 64, in 10 families.
