= Eslamabad-e Kahan Changar =

Eslamabad-e Kahan Changar اسلام ابادكهن چنگر
- Village
- Interactive map of Eslamabad-e Kahan Changar
- Country: Iran
- Province: Kerman
- County: Qaleh Ganj
- Bakhsh: Chah Dadkhoda
- Rural District: Rameshk

Population (2006)
  - Total: 183
- Time zone: UTC+3:30 (IRST)
  - Summer (DST): UTC+4:30 (IRDT)

Eslamabad-e Kahan Changar (Persian: اسلام ابادكهن چنگر, also Romanized as Eslāmābād-e Kahan Changar) is a village in Rameshk Rural District, Chah Dadkhoda District, Qaleh Ganj County, Kerman Province, Iran. At the 2006 census, its population was 183, in 39 families.
