= Eslamabad, Jiroft =

Eslamabad اسلام اباد
- Village
- Location within Iran
- Coordinates: 28°32′21″N 57°47′07″E
- Country: Iran
- Province: Kerman
- County: Jiroft
- Bakhsh: Central
- Rural District: Eslamabad

Population (2006)
  - Total: 257
- Time zone: UTC+3:30 (IRST)
  - Summer (DST): UTC+4:30 (IRDT)

Eslamabad (Persian: اسلام اباد, also Romanized as Eslāmābād) is a village in Eslamabad Rural District, in the Central District of Jiroft County, Kerman Province, Iran. At the 2006 census, its population was 257, in 53 families.
