= Eslamabad, Qorveh =

Eslamabad اسلام آباد
- Village
- Country: Iran
- Province: Kurdistan
- County: Qorveh
- Bakhsh: Serishabad
- Rural District: Qaslan

Population (2006)
  - Total: 406
- Time zone: UTC+3:30 (IRST)
  - Summer (DST): UTC+4:30 (IRDT)

Eslamabad (Persian: اسلام آباد, also Romanized as Eslāmābād) is a village in Qaslan Rural District, Serishabad District, Qorveh County, Kurdistan Province, Iran. At the 2006 census, its population was 406, in 97 families. The village is populated by Azerbaijanis.
