= Eslamabad-e Sofla, Kermanshah =

Village in Kermanshah province, Iran

Eslamabad-e Sofla Persian: اسلام اباد سفلي
- Village
- Location within Iran
- Coordinates: 34°36′52″N 47°39′53″E
- Country: Iran
- Province: Kermanshah
- County: Sahneh
- District: Central
- Rural District: Khodabandehlu

Population (2016)
  - Total: 419
- Time zone: UTC+3:30 (IRST)

Eslamabad-e Sofla (Persian: اسلام ابادسفلي) (Note: Also romanized as Eslāmābād-e Soflá; also known as Kangar Shāh, Kangar Shāh-e Pā’īn, Kangar Shāh-e Soflá, Kangareh Shāh-e Soflá, Kangarshāh, and Kangarshāh Pāīn) is a village in Khodabandehlu Rural District of the Central District of Sahneh County, Kermanshah province, Iran.

== Demographics ==
=== Population ===
At the time of the 2006 National Census, the village's population was 598 in 162 households. The following census in 2011 counted 583 people in 190 households. The 2016 census measured the population of the village as 419 people in 134 households. It was the most populous village in its rural district.
