= Eslamabad-e Pain, Sistan and Baluchestan =

Eslamabad-e Pain اسلام آباد پايين
- Village
- Location within Iran
- Coordinates: 25°45′56″N 61°23′53″E
- Country: Iran
- Province: Sistan and Baluchestan
- County: Chabahar
- Bakhsh: Dashtiari
- Rural District: Bahu Kalat

Population (2006)
  - Total: 741
- Time zone: UTC+3:30 (IRST)
  - Summer (DST): UTC+4:30 (IRDT)

Eslamabad-e Pain (Persian: اسلام آباد پايين, also Romanized as Eslāmābād-e Pā’īn; also known as Eslāmābād) is a village in Bahu Kalat Rural District, Dashtiari District, Chabahar County, Sistan and Baluchestan Province, Iran. At the 2006 census, its population was 741, in 198 families.
