= Eslamabad-e Sofla, Lorestan =

Eslamabad-e Sofla اسلام ابادسفلي
- Village
- Location within Iran
- Coordinates: 33°29′16″N 48°47′06″E
- Country: Iran
- Province: Lorestan
- County: Khorramabad
- Bakhsh: Zagheh
- Rural District: Qaedrahmat

Population (2006)
  - Total: 175
- Time zone: UTC+3:30 (IRST)
  - Summer (DST): UTC+4:30 (IRDT)

Eslamabad-e Sofla (Persian: اسلام ابادسفلي, also Romanized as Eslāmābād-e Soflá) is a village in Qaedrahmat Rural District, Zagheh District, Khorramabad County, Lorestan Province, Iran. Its population was 175, in 36 families in the 2006 census.
