= Eslamabad-e Yek, Chaharmahal and Bakhtiari =

Eslamabad-e Yek اسلام اباد1
- Village
- Location within Iran
- Coordinates: 31°16′34″N 51°09′55″E
- Country: Iran
- Province: Chaharmahal and Bakhtiari
- County: Lordegan
- Bakhsh: Falard
- Rural District: Poshtkuh

Population (2006)
  - Total: 429
- Time zone: UTC+3:30 (IRST)
  - Summer (DST): UTC+4:30 (IRDT)

Eslamabad-e Yek (Persian: اسلام اباد1, also Romanized as Eslāmābād-e Yek; also known as Eslāmābād) is a village in Poshtkuh Rural District, Falard District, Lordegan County, Chaharmahal and Bakhtiari Province, Iran. At the 2006 census, its population was 429, in 78 families.
