= Eslamabad-e Sofla, Ilam =

Eslamabad-e Sofla اسلام ابادسفلي
- Village
- Location within Iran
- Coordinates: 33°10′53″N 47°20′56″E
- Country: Iran
- Province: Ilam
- County: Darreh Shahr
- Bakhsh: Central
- Rural District: Zarrin Dasht

Population (2006)
  - Total: 940
- Time zone: UTC+3:30 (IRST)
  - Summer (DST): UTC+4:30 (IRDT)

Eslamabad-e Sofla (Persian: اسلام ابادسفلي, also Romanized as Eslāmābād-e Soflá; also known as Eslāmābād) is a village in Zarrin Dasht Rural District, in the Central District of Darreh Shahr County, Ilam Province, Iran. At the 2006 census, its population was 940, in 212 families. The village is populated by Kurds.
