= Eslamabad-e Olya, Kermanshah =

Eslamabad-e Olya اسلام ابادعليا
- Village
- Location within Iran
- Coordinates: 34°36′18″N 47°41′30″E
- Country: Iran
- Province: Kermanshah
- County: Sahneh
- Bakhsh: Central
- Rural District: Khodabandehlu

Population (2006)
  - Total: 242
- Time zone: UTC+3:30 (IRST)
  - Summer (DST): UTC+4:30 (IRDT)

Eslamabad-e Olya (Persian: اسلام ابادعليا, also Romanized as Eslāmābād-e ‘Olyā) is a village in Khodabandehlu Rural District, in the Central District of Sahneh County, Kermanshah Province, Iran. At the 2006 census, its population was 242, in 62 families.
