= Eslamabad-e Olya, Ilam =

Village in Ilam, Iran

Eslamabad-e Olya اسلام ابادعليا
- Village
- Location within Iran
- Coordinates: 33°10′11″N 47°20′18″E
- Country: Iran
- Province: Ilam
- County: Darreh Shahr
- Bakhsh: Central
- Rural District: Zarrin Dasht

Population (2006)
  - Total: 60
- Time zone: UTC+3:30 (IRST)
  - Summer (DST): UTC+4:30 (IRDT)

Eslamabad-e Olya (Persian: اسلام ابادعليا, also Romanized as Eslāmābād-e ‘Olyā) is a village in Zarrin Dasht Rural District, in the Central District of Darreh Shahr County, Ilam Province, Iran. At the 2006 census, its population was 60, in 12 families. The village is populated by Kurds.
