= Eslamabad-e Olya, Khuzestan =

Eslamabad-e Olya اسلام ابادعليا
- Village
- Location within Iran
- Coordinates: 30°34′24″N 50°18′03″E
- Country: Iran
- Province: Khuzestan
- County: Behbahan
- Bakhsh: Central
- Rural District: Howmeh

Population (2006)
  - Total: 1,404
- Time zone: UTC+3:30 (IRST)
  - Summer (DST): UTC+4:30 (IRDT)

Eslamabad-e Olya (Persian: اسلام ابادعليا, also Romanized as Eslāmābād-e ‘Olyā; also known as Eslāmābād and Tol Chāh) is a village in Howmeh Rural District, in the Central District of Behbahan County, Khuzestan Province, Iran. At the 2006 census, its population was 1,404, in 264 families.
