= Rig-e Sefid, Selseleh =

Rig-e Sefid ريگ سفيد
- Village
- Location within Iran
- Coordinates: 33°48′34″N 48°09′57″E
- Country: Iran
- Province: Lorestan
- County: Selseleh
- Bakhsh: Central
- Rural District: Doab

Population (2006)
  - Total: 30
- Time zone: UTC+3:30 (IRST)
  - Summer (DST): UTC+4:30 (IRDT)

Rig-e Sefid (Persian: ريگ سفيد, also Romanized as Rīg-e Sefīd; also known as Eslāmābād, Rīg Sepīd, and Rīkh Asbī) is a village in Doab Rural District, in the Central District of Selseleh County, Lorestan Province, Iran. At the 2006 census, its population was 30, in 7 families.
