= Eslamabad, Bashagard =

Eslamabad اسلام آباد
- Village
- Location within Iran
- Coordinates: 26°43′58″N 57°53′47″E
- Country: Iran
- Province: Hormozgan
- County: Bashagard
- Bakhsh: Gowharan
- Rural District: Gowharan

Population (2006)
  - Total: 129
- Time zone: UTC+3:30 (IRST)
  - Summer (DST): UTC+4:30 (IRDT)

Eslamabad (Persian: اسلام آباد, also Romanized as Eslāmābād; also known as Dargī) is a village in the Gowharan District, Bashagard County, Hormozgan Province, Iran. At the 2006 census, its population was 129, in 25 families.
