= Eslamabad-e Olya, Pol-e Dokhtar =

Village in Lorestan province, Iran

Eslamabad-e Olya Persian: اسلام آباد عليا
- Village
- Location within Iran
- Coordinates: 33°08′02″N 47°41′56″E
- Country: Iran
- Province: Lorestan
- County: Pol-e Dokhtar
- District: Central
- Rural District: Jayedar-e Shomali

Population (2016)
  - Total: 298
- Time zone: UTC+3:30 (IRST)

Eslamabad-e Olya (Persian: اسلام آباد عليا) (Note: Also romanized as Eslāmābād-e ‘Olyā) is a village in Jayedar-e Shomali Rural District (Note: Formerly Jayedar Rural District) of the Central District in Pol-e Dokhtar County, Lorestan province, Iran.

== Demographics ==
=== Population ===
At the time of the 2006 National Census, the village's population was 234 in 45 households. The following census in 2011 counted 276 people in 73 households. The 2016 census measured the population of the village as 298 people in 88 households.
