= Eslamabad-e Olya, Khorramabad =

Eslamabad-e Olya اسلام ابادعليا
- Village
- Location within Iran
- Coordinates: 33°29′08″N 48°47′29″E
- Country: Iran
- Province: Lorestan
- County: Khorramabad
- Bakhsh: Zagheh
- Rural District: Qaedrahmat

Population (2006)
  - Total: 21
- Time zone: UTC+3:30 (IRST)
  - Summer (DST): UTC+4:30 (IRDT)

Eslamabad-e Olya (Persian: اسلام ابادعليا, also Romanized as Eslāmābād-e ‘Olyā) is a village in Qaedrahmat Rural District, Zagheh District, Khorramabad County, Lorestan Province, Iran. At the 2006 census, its population was 21, in 6 families.
