= Hajji Jalil =

Village in Chaharmahal and Bakhtiari province, Iran

Hajji Jalil Persian: حاجی جلیل
- Village
- Location within Iran
- Coordinates: 32°15′27″N 50°18′46″E
- Country: Iran
- Province: Chaharmahal and Bakhtiari
- County: Kuhrang
- District: Doab Samsami
- Rural District: Shahriari

Population (2016)
  - Total: 100
- Time zone: UTC+3:30 (IRST)

Hajji Jalil (Persian: حاجی جلیل) (Note: Also romanized as Ḩājjī Jalīl; also known as Ḩājjīābād-e Jalīl) is a village in Shahriari Rural District of Doab Samsami District in Kuhrang County, Chaharmahal and Bakhtiari province, Iran.

== Demographics ==
=== Ethnicity ===
The village is populated by Lurs.

=== Population ===
At the time of the 2006 National Census, the village's population was 68 in 16 households, when it was in Shurab-e Tangazi Rural District of the Central District. The following census in 2011 counted 38 people in 11 households, by which time Doab Rural District had been separated from the district in the formation of Doab Samsami District. Bidamin was transferred to Shahriari Rural District created in the new district. The 2016 census measured the population of the village as 100 people in 28 households.
