= Gholamabad =

Gholamabad (Persian: غلام آباد) may refer to:

- Gholamabad (32°22′ N 50°22′ E), Kuhrang, Chaharmahal and Bakhtiari Province
- Gholamabad (32°29′ N 50°15′ E), Kuhrang, Chaharmahal and Bakhtiari Province
- Gholamabad, Fars
- Gholamabad, Golestan
- Gholamabad, Ilam
- Gholamabad-e Khayyat, Lorestan Province
