= Bidamin =

Village in Chaharmahal and Bakhtiari province, Iran

Bidamin Persian: بيدامين
- Village
- Location within Iran
- Coordinates: 32°17′01″N 50°14′49″E
- Country: Iran
- Province: Chaharmahal and Bakhtiari
- County: Kuhrang
- District: Doab Samsami
- Rural District: Shahriari

Population (2016)
  - Total: 195
- Time zone: UTC+3:30 (IRST)

Bidamin (Persian: بيدامين) (Note: Also romanized as Bīdamīn; also known as Qal‘eh Bīdemī, Qal‘eh-ye Bīdamī, and Qal‘eh-ye Bīdomī) is a village in Shahriari Rural District of Doab Samsami District in Kuhrang County, Chaharmahal and Bakhtiari province, Iran.

== Demographics ==
=== Ethnicity ===
The village is populated by Lurs.

=== Population ===
At the time of the 2006 National Census, the village's population was 183 in 40 households, when it was in Shurab-e Tangazi Rural District of the Central District. The following census in 2011 counted 99 people in 25 households, by which time Doab Rural District had been separated from the district in the formation of Doab Samsami District. Bidamin was transferred to Shahriari Rural District created in the new district. The 2016 census measured the population of the village as 195 people in 53 households. It was the most populous village in its rural district.
