= Darkabad, Chaharmahal and Bakhtiari =

Village in Chaharmahal and Bakhtiari province, Iran

Darkabad Persian: درک‌آباد
- Village
- Country: Iran
- Province: Chaharmahal and Bakhtiari
- County: Kuhrang
- District: Doab Samsami
- Rural District: Shahriari

Population (2016)
  - Total: 100
- Time zone: UTC+3:30 (IRST)

Darkabad (Persian: درک‌آباد) (Note: Also romanized as Darkābād) is a village in Shahriari Rural District of Doab Samsami District in Kuhrang County, Chaharmahal and Bakhtiari province, Iran.

== Demographics ==
=== Population ===
At the time of the 2006 National Census, the village's population was 43 in 11 households, when it was in Shurab-e Tangazi Rural District of the Central District. The following census in 2011 counted 31 people in eight households, by which time Doab Rural District had been separated from the district in the formation of Doab Samsami District. Bidamin was transferred to Shahriari Rural District created in the new district. The 2016 census measured the population of the village as 100 people in 27 households.
