= Shahriari, Chaharmahal and Bakhtiari =

Village in Chaharmahal and Bakhtiari province, Iran

Shahriari Persian: شهریاری
- Village
- Location within Iran
- Coordinates: 32°15′57″N 50°16′05″E
- Country: Iran
- Province: Chaharmahal and Bakhtiari
- County: Kuhrang
- District: Doab Samsami
- Rural District: Shahriari

Population (2016)
  - Total: 169
- Time zone: UTC+3:30 (IRST)

Shahriari (Persian: شهریاری) (Note: Also romanized as Shahrīārī and Shahrīyārī) is a village in, and the capital of, Shahriari Rural District in Doab Samsami District of Kuhrang County, Chaharmahal and Bakhtiari province, Iran.

== Demographics ==
=== Ethnicity ===
The village is populated by Lurs.

=== Population ===
At the time of the 2006 National Census, the village's population was 189 in 47 households, when it was in Shurab-e Tangazi Rural District of the Central District. The following census in 2011 counted 32 people in 12 households, by which time the village had been transferred to Shahriari Rural District created in the new Doab Samsami District. The 2016 census measured the population of the village as 169 people in 46 households.
