= Gerdu =

Gerdu or Gardu or Gordu (Persian: گردو) may refer to:

- Gerdu-ye Olya, Chaharmahal and Bakhtiari Province
- Gerdu-ye Sofla, Chaharmahal and Bakhtiari Province
- Gerdu, Hormozgan
- Gerdu, Bandar Abbas, Hormozgan Province
