= Gholamabad (32°29′ N 50°15′ E), Kuhrang =

Gholamabad غلام اباد
- Village
- Location within Iran
- Coordinates: 32°28′59″N 50°15′17″E
- Country: Iran
- Province: Chaharmahal and Bakhtiari
- County: Kuhrang
- Bakhsh: Central
- Rural District: Dasht-e Zarrin

Population (2006)
  - Total: 89
- Time zone: UTC+3:30 (IRST)
  - Summer (DST): UTC+4:30 (IRDT)

Gholamabad (Persian: غلام اباد, also Romanized as Gholāmābād) is a village in Dasht-e Zarrin Rural District, in the Central District of Kuhrang County, Chaharmahal and Bakhtiari Province, Iran. At the 2006 census, its population was 89, in 13 families. The village is populated by Lurs.
