= Darreh-ye Pir, Chaharmahal and Bakhtiari =

Darreh-ye Pir دره پير
- Village
- Location within Iran
- Coordinates: 32°25′43″N 50°19′52″E
- Country: Iran
- Province: Chaharmahal and Bakhtiari
- County: Kuhrang
- Bakhsh: Central
- Rural District: Dasht-e Zarrin

Population (2006)
  - Total: 83
- Time zone: UTC+3:30 (IRST)
  - Summer (DST): UTC+4:30 (IRDT)

Darreh-ye Pir (Persian: دره پير, also Romanized as Darreh-ye Pīr and Darreh Pīr; also known as Dar Pīreh) is a village in Dasht-e Zarrin Rural District, in the Central District of Kuhrang County, Chaharmahal and Bakhtiari Province, Iran. At the 2006 census, its population was 83, in 11 families. The village is populated by Lurs.
