= Talu, Chaharmahal and Bakhtiari =

Talu تلو
- Village
- Location within Iran
- Coordinates: 32°45′34″N 49°46′06″E
- Country: Iran
- Province: Chaharmahal and Bakhtiari
- County: Kuhrang
- Bakhsh: Central
- Rural District: Miankuh-e Moguyi

Population (2006)
  - Total: 206
- Time zone: UTC+3:30 (IRST)
  - Summer (DST): UTC+4:30 (IRDT)

Talu (Persian: تلو, also Romanized as Talū; also known as Taklū and Telkow) is a village in Miankuh-e Moguyi Rural District, in the Central District of Kuhrang County, Chaharmahal and Bakhtiari Province, Iran. At the 2006 census, its population was 206, in 29 families. The village is populated by Lurs.
