= Sar Aqa Seyyed =

Village in Chaharmahal and Bakhtiari province, Iran

Sar Aqa Seyyed Persian: سراقاسيد
- Village
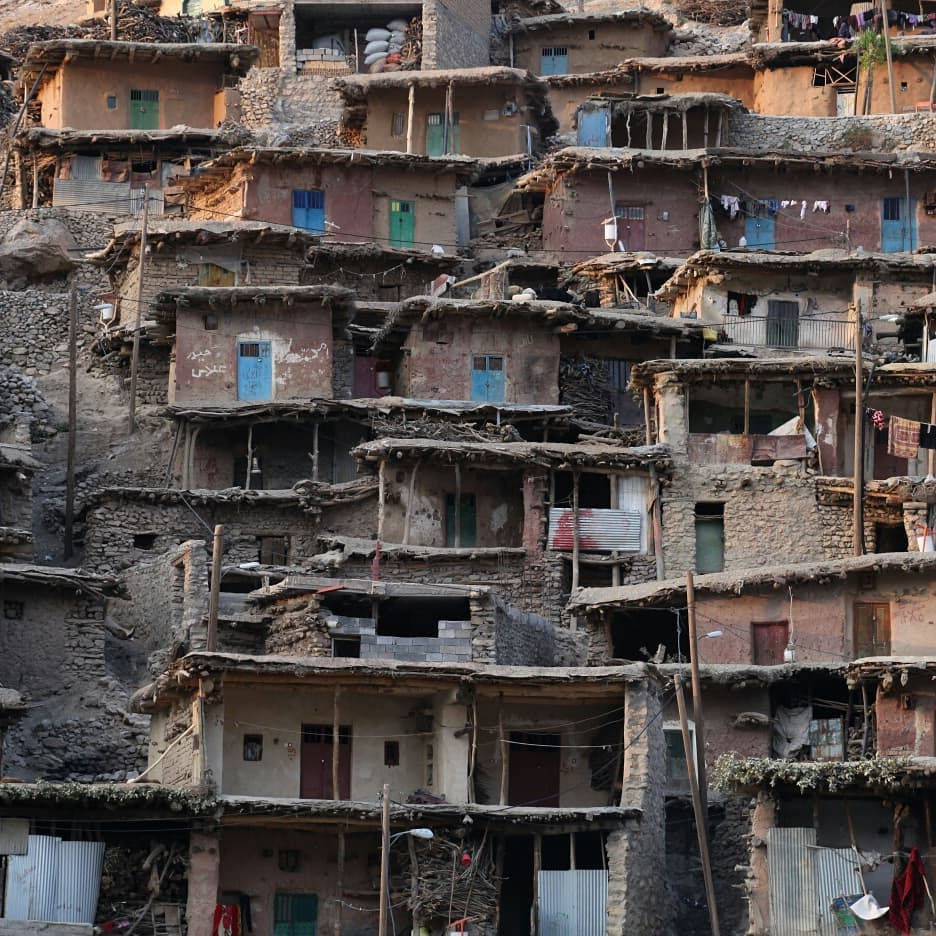
- Sar Aqa Seyyed

- Location within Iran
- Coordinates: 32°39′30″N 49°51′52″E
- Country: Iran
- Province: Chaharmahal and Bakhtiari
- County: Kuhrang
- District: Central
- Rural District: Miankuh-e Moguyi

Population (2016)
  - Total: 1,698
- Time zone: UTC+3:30 (IRST)

Sar Aqa Seyyed (Persian: سراقاسيد) (Note: Also romanized as Sar Āqā Seyyed; also known as Sar Agha Seyed) is a village in Miankuh-e Moguyi Rural District of the Central District in Kuhrang County, Chaharmahal and Bakhtiari province, Iran.

== Demographics ==
=== Ethnicity ===
The village is populated by Lurs.

=== Population ===
At the time of the 2006 National Census, the village's population was 1,360 in 208 households. The following census in 2011 counted 1,236 people in 275 households. The 2016 census measured the population of the village as 1,698 people in 380 households. It was the most populous village in its rural district.

== Architecture ==
The village is named after Aqa Seyyed shrine. It is known for its unusual architecture. Its interconnected buildings are built into the surrounding mountain. The roofs of the buildings serve as courtyards and streets of the buildings above. Most of the homes have no windows and only one door.

Because of the similarity of architecture, Sar Aqa Seyyed village is called The Masuleh of Zagros. Also, tourists explore this village for its nomads.
