= Gerdu-ye Sofla =

Village in Chaharmahal and Bakhtiari, Iran

Gerdu-ye Sofla گردوسفلي
- Village
- Location within Iran
- Coordinates: 32°26′40″N 50°18′10″E
- Country: Iran
- Province: Chaharmahal and Bakhtiari
- County: Kuhrang
- Bakhsh: Central
- Rural District: Dasht-e Zarrin

Population (2006)
  - Total: 255
- Time zone: UTC+3:30 (IRST)
  - Summer (DST): UTC+4:30 (IRDT)

Gerdu-ye Sofla (Persian: گردوسفلي, also Romanized as Gerdū-ye Soflá and Gerdūsoflá) is a village in Dasht-e Zarrin Rural District, in the Central District of Kuhrang County, Chaharmahal and Bakhtiari Province, Iran. At the 2006 census, its population was 255, in 52 families. The village is populated by Lurs.
