= Nal Eshkenan =

Nal Eshkenan (Persian: نعل اشكنان), also rendered as Naleshgarun, Naleshgerun, or Nalesh Garun, may refer to:

- Nal Eshkenan-e Olya
- Nal Eshkenan-e Sofla
