= Nasirabad, Dasht-e Zarrin =

Village in Chaharmahal and Bakhtiari province, Iran

Nasirabad Persian: نصیرآباد
- Village
- Location within Iran
- Coordinates: 32°22′43″N 50°18′33″E
- Country: Iran
- Province: Chaharmahal and Bakhtiari
- County: Kuhrang
- District: Central
- Rural District: Dasht-e Zarrin

Population (2016)
  - Total: 885
- Time zone: UTC+3:30 (IRST)

Nasirabad (Persian: نصیرآباد) (Note: Also romanized as Naşīrābād) is a village in Dasht-e Zarrin Rural District of the Central District in Kuhrang County, Chaharmahal and Bakhtiari province, Iran.

== Demographics ==
=== Ethnicity ===
The village is populated by Lurs.

=== Population ===
At the time of the 2006 National Census, the village's population was 546 in 111 households. The following census in 2011 counted 719 people in 165 households. The 2016 census measured the population of the village as 885 people in 241 households.
