= Nal Eshkenan-e Olya =

Nal Eshkenan-e Olya نعل اشكنان عليا
- Village
- Location within Iran
- Coordinates: 32°24′57″N 50°19′07″E
- Country: Iran
- Province: Chaharmahal and Bakhtiari
- County: Kuhrang
- Bakhsh: Central
- Rural District: Dasht-e Zarrin

Population (2006)
  - Total: 228
- Time zone: UTC+3:30 (IRST)
  - Summer (DST): UTC+4:30 (IRDT)

Nal Eshkenan-e Olya (Persian: نعل اشكنان عليا, also Romanized as Na'l Eshkenān-e 'Olyā; also known as Nāleshgarūn-e Bālā, Nālesh Garūn 'Olyā, and Nāleshgerūn 'Olyā) is a village in Dasht-e Zarrin Rural District, in the Central District of Kuhrang County, Chaharmahal and Bakhtiari Province, Iran. At the 2006 census, its population was 228, in 45 families. The village is populated by Lurs.
