= Afsarabad =

Village in Chaharmahal and Bakhtiari province, Iran

Afsarabad Persian: افسراباد
- Village
- Location within Iran
- Coordinates: 32°09′01″N 50°26′11″E
- Country: Iran
- Province: Chaharmahal and Bakhtiari
- County: Kuhrang
- District: Doab Samsami
- Rural District: Doab

Population (2016)
  - Total: 329
- Time zone: UTC+3:30 (IRST)

Afsarabad (Persian: افسراباد) (Note: Also romanized as Afsarābād; also known as Tūtestān and Tūtūstān) is a village in Doab Rural District of Doab Samsami District in Kuhrang County, Chaharmahal and Bakhtiari province, Iran.

== Demographics ==
=== Ethnicity ===
The village is populated by Lurs.

=== Population ===
At the time of the 2006 National Census, the village's population was 503 in 77 households, when it was in Bazoft District. The following census in 2011 counted 456 people in 100 households, by which time the rural district had been separated from the district in the formation of Doab Samsami District. The 2016 census measured the population of the village as 329 people in 122 households. It was the most populous village in its rural district.
