= Gerdu-ye Olya =

Gerdu-ye Olya گردوعليا
- Village
- Location within Iran
- Coordinates: 32°27′18″N 50°18′39″E
- Country: Iran
- Province: Chaharmahal and Bakhtiari
- County: Kuhrang
- Bakhsh: Central
- Rural District: Dasht-e Zarrin

Population (2006)
  - Total: 230
- Time zone: UTC+3:30 (IRST)
  - Summer (DST): UTC+4:30 (IRDT)

Gerdu-ye Olya (Persian: گردوعليا, also Romanized as Gerdū-ye ‘Olyā and Gerdū ‘Olyā; also known as Gerdū Bālā and Gerdū Qal’eh) is a village in Dasht-e Zarrin Rural District, in the Central District of Kuhrang County, Chaharmahal and Bakhtiari Province, Iran. At the 2006 census, its population was 230, in 40 families. The village is populated by Lurs.
