= Deymeh, Chaharmahal and Bakhtiari =

Village in Chaharmahal and Bakhtiari province, Iran

Deymeh Persian: ديمه
- Village
- Location within Iran
- Coordinates: 32°30′31″N 50°13′10″E
- Country: Iran
- Province: Chaharmahal and Bakhtiari
- County: Kuhrang
- District: Central
- Rural District: Shurab-e Tangazi

Population (2016)
  - Total: 509
- Time zone: UTC+3:30 (IRST)

Deymeh (Persian: ديمه) (Note: Also romanized as Dīmeh) is a village in Shurab-e Tangazi Rural District of the Central District in Kuhrang County, Chaharmahal and Bakhtiari province, Iran.

== Demographics ==
=== Ethnicity ===
The village is populated by Lurs.

=== Population ===
At the time of the 2006 National Census, the village's population was 298 in 62 households. The following census in 2011 counted 277 people in 72 households. The 2016 census measured the population of the village as 509 people in 134 households.
