= Darreh-ye Pir =

Darreh-ye Pir or Darreh Pir (Persian: دره پير) may refer to:

- Darreh-ye Pir, Chaharmahal and Bakhtiari
- Darreh-ye Pir, Andika, Khuzestan Province
