= Salehabad-e Zari =

Village in Chaharmahal and Bakhtiari province, Iran

Salehabad-e Zari Persian: صالح‌آباد زری
- Village
- Location within Iran
- Coordinates: 32°24′28″N 50°16′06″E
- Country: Iran
- Province: Chaharmahal and Bakhtiari
- County: Kuhrang
- District: Central
- Rural District: Dasht-e Zarrin

Population (2016)
  - Total: 151
- Time zone: UTC+3:30 (IRST)

Salehabad-e Zari (Persian: صالح‌آباد زری) (Note: Also romanized as Şāleḩābād-e Zarī; also known as Şāleḩābād) is a village in, and the capital of, Dasht-e Zarrin Rural District in the Central District of Kuhrang County, Chaharmahal and Bakhtiari province, Iran.

== Demographics ==
=== Ethnicity ===
The village is populated by Lurs.

=== Population ===
At the time of the 2006 National Census, the village's population was 111 in 19 households. The following census in 2011 counted 98 people in 22 households. The 2016 census measured the population of the village as 151 people in 41 households.
