= Nal Eshkenan-e Sofla =

Nal Eshkenan-e Sofla نعل اشكنان سفلي
- Village
- Location within Iran
- Coordinates: 32°26′17″N 50°17′56″E
- Country: Iran
- Province: Chaharmahal and Bakhtiari
- County: Kuhrang
- Bakhsh: Central
- Rural District: Dasht-e Zarrin

Population (2006)
  - Total: 118
- Time zone: UTC+3:30 (IRST)
  - Summer (DST): UTC+4:30 (IRDT)

Nal Eshkenan-e Sofla (Persian: نعل اشكنان سفلي, also Romanized as Na‘l Eshkenān-e Soflá; also known as Nāleshgarūn-e Soflá) is a village in Dasht-e Zarrin Rural District, in the Central District of Kuhrang County, Chaharmahal and Bakhtiari Province, Iran. At the 2006 census, its population was 118, in 20 families. The village is populated by Lurs.
