= Qaleh-ye Aliabad =

Village in Chaharmahal and Bakhtiari province, Iran

Qaleh-ye Aliabad Persian: قلعه علي اباد
- Village
- Location within Iran
- Coordinates: 32°23′33″N 50°17′41″E
- Country: Iran
- Province: Chaharmahal and Bakhtiari
- County: Kuhrang
- District: Central
- Rural District: Dasht-e Zarrin

Population (2016)
  - Total: 929
- Time zone: UTC+3:30 (IRST)

Qaleh-ye Aliabad (Persian: قلعه علي اباد) (Note: Also romanized as Qal‘eh-ye ‘Alīābād) is a village in Dasht-e Zarrin Rural District of the Central District in Kuhrang County, Chaharmahal and Bakhtiari province, Iran.

== Demographics ==
=== Ethnicity ===
The village is populated by Lurs.

=== Population ===
At the time of the 2006 National Census, the village's population was 991 in 209 households. The following census in 2011 counted 993 people in 258 households. The 2016 census measured the population of the village as 929 people in 246 households. It was the most populous village in its rural district.
