= Mian Rudan-e Yek =

Village in Chaharmahal and Bakhtiari province, Iran

Mian Rudan-e Yek Persian: میانرودان ۱
- Village
- Location within Iran
- Coordinates: 32°28′59″N 50°10′59″E
- Country: Iran
- Province: Chaharmahal and Bakhtiari
- County: Kuhrang
- District: Central
- Rural District: Shurab-e Tangazi

Population (2016)
  - Total: 439
- Time zone: UTC+3:30 (IRST)

Mian Rudan-e Yek (Persian: میانرودان ۱) (Note: Also romanized as Mīān Rūdān-e Yek; also known as Meyān Rūdān and Mīān Rūdān) is a village in Shurab-e Tangazi Rural District of the Central District in Kuhrang County, Chaharmahal and Bakhtiari province, Iran.

== Demographics ==
=== Ethnicity ===
The village is populated by Lurs.

=== Population ===
At the time of the 2006 National Census, the village's population was 353 in 55 households. The following census in 2011 counted 345 people in 77 households. The 2016 census measured the population of the village as 439 people in 109 households.
