= Talu =

Talu may refer to:

== People ==
- Çiğdem Talu, Turkish pop music songwriter
- Naim Talu, Turkish economist, banker, and politician
- Wang Talu, Taiwanese actor

== Places ==
- Talu, Tibet
- Khao Ok Talu, mountain located in Phatthalung Province, Thailand
- Talu Na Mohra, town in the Islamabad Capital Territory of Pakistan
- Talu, West Pasaman, a village (kelurahan) in West Pasaman Regency, West Sumatra, Indonesia
- Talu, Bhiwani, a village in the Indian state of Haryana
- Talu, Iran (disambiguation), places in Iran
- Talu, Wanquan in Wanquan, Honghu, Jingzhou, Hubei, China

== Other uses ==
- Talu language, a Loloish language of China
