= Shahrak-e Miheh =

Village in Chaharmahal and Bakhtiari province, Iran

Shahrak-e Miheh Persian: شهرک میهه
- Village
- Location within Iran
- Coordinates: 32°24′04″N 50°21′23″E
- Country: Iran
- Province: Chaharmahal and Bakhtiari
- County: Kuhrang
- District: Central
- Rural District: Dasht-e Zarrin

Population (2016)
  - Total: 820
- Time zone: UTC+3:30 (IRST)

Shahrak-e Miheh (Persian: شهرک میهه) (Note: Also romanized as Shahrak-e Mīheh; also known as Meyheh-ye ‘Olyā) is a village in Dasht-e Zarrin Rural District of the Central District in Kuhrang County, Chaharmahal and Bakhtiari province, Iran.

== Demographics ==
=== Ethnicity ===
The village is populated by Lurs.

=== Population ===
At the time of the 2006 National Census, the village's population was 822 in 161 households. The following census in 2011 counted 931 people in 218 households. The 2016 census measured the population of the village as 820 people in 216 households.
