= Fakhrabad, Chaharmahal and Bakhtiari =

Village in Chaharmahal and Bakhtiari province, Iran

Fakhrabad Persian: فخراباد
- Village
- Location within Iran
- Coordinates: 32°09′14″N 50°22′43″E
- Country: Iran
- Province: Chaharmahal and Bakhtiari
- County: Kuhrang
- District: Doab Samsami
- Rural District: Doab

Population (2016)
  - Total: 261
- Time zone: UTC+3:30 (IRST)

Fakhrabad (Persian: فخراباد) (Note: Also romanized as Fakhrābād) is a village in Doab Rural District of Doab Samsami District in Kuhrang County, Chaharmahal and Bakhtiari province, Iran.

== Demographics ==
=== Ethnicity ===
The village is populated by Lurs.

=== Population ===
At the time of the 2006 National Census, the village's population was 286 in 51 households, when it was in Bazoft District. The following census in 2011 counted 326 people in 73 households, by which time the rural district had been separated from the district in the formation of Doab Samsami District. The 2016 census measured the population of the village as 261 people in 72 households.
