= Dezak-e Olya =

Village in Chaharmahal and Bakhtiari province, Iran

Dezak-e Olya Persian: دزک علیا
- Village
- Location within Iran
- Coordinates: 32°09′50″N 50°19′37″E
- Country: Iran
- Province: Chaharmahal and Bakhtiari
- County: Kuhrang
- District: Doab Samsami
- Rural District: Doab

Population (2016)
  - Total: 250
- Time zone: UTC+3:30 (IRST)

Dezak-e Olya (Persian: دزک علیا) (Note: Also romanized as Dezak ‘Olyā and Dezak-e ‘Olyā; also known as Deh-e Mash ‘Alī Moḩammad, Dezdak Bālā, Dozdak-e Bālā, and Dozdak-e ‘Olyā) is a village in Doab Rural District of Doab Samsami District in Kuhrang County, Chaharmahal and Bakhtiari province, Iran.

== Demographics ==
=== Ethnicity ===
The village is populated by Lurs.

=== Population ===
At the time of the 2006 National Census, the village's population was 270 in 56 households, when it was in Bazoft District. The following census in 2011 counted 325 people in 78 households, by which time the rural district had been separated from the district in the formation of Doab Samsami District. The 2016 census measured the population of the village as 250 people in 86 households.
