= Sar Saleh Kutah =

Village in Chaharmahal and Bakhtiari province, Iran

Sar Saleh Kutah Persian: سرصالح كوتاه
- Village
- Location within Iran
- Coordinates: 32°43′16″N 49°45′49″E
- Country: Iran
- Province: Chaharmahal and Bakhtiari
- County: Kuhrang
- District: Central
- Rural District: Miankuh-e Moguyi

Population (2016)
  - Total: 358
- Time zone: UTC+3:30 (IRST)

Sar Saleh Kutah (Persian: سرصالح كوتاه) (Note: Also romanized as Sar Şāleḩ Kūtāh; also known as Saleh Kootah and Şāleḩ Kūtāh) is a village in Miankuh-e Moguyi Rural District of the Central District in Kuhrang County, Chaharmahal and Bakhtiari province, Iran.

== Demographics ==
=== Ethnicity ===
The village is populated by Lurs.

=== Population ===
At the time of the 2006 National Census, the village's population was 458 in 88 households. The following census in 2011 counted 443 people in 90 households. The 2016 census measured the population of the village as 358 people in 77 households.
