= Khuyeh =

Village in Chaharmahal and Bakhtiari province, Iran

Khuyeh Persian: خويه
- Village
- Location within Iran
- Coordinates: 32°42′42″N 49°49′35″E
- Country: Iran
- Province: Chaharmahal and Bakhtiari
- County: Kuhrang
- District: Central
- Rural District: Miankuh-e Moguyi

Population (2016)
  - Total: 1,046
- Time zone: UTC+3:30 (IRST)

Khuyeh (Persian: خويه) (Note: Also romanized as Khooyeh and Khūyeh; also known as Khūyeh Pā’īn and Khūyeh-ye Soflá) is a village in, and the capital of Miankuh-e Moguyi Rural District in the Central District of Kuhrang County, Chaharmahal and Bakhtiari province, Iran.

== Demographics ==
=== Ethnicity ===
The village is populated by Lurs.

=== Population ===
At the time of the 2006 National Census, the village's population was 855 in 142 households. The following census in 2011 counted 767 people in 174 households. The 2016 census measured the population of the village as 1,046 people in 263 households.
