= Birahgan =

Village in Chaharmahal and Bakhtiari province, Iran

Birahgan Persian: بيراهگان
- Village
- Location within Iran
- Coordinates: 32°39′13″N 49°54′39″E
- Country: Iran
- Province: Chaharmahal and Bakhtiari
- County: Kuhrang
- District: Central
- Rural District: Miankuh-e Moguyi

Population (2016)
  - Total: 213
- Time zone: UTC+3:30 (IRST)

Birahgan (Persian: بيراهگان) (Note: Also romanized as Bīrāhgān; also known as Bīr Āvgān, Bīr Hangān, and Birahkan) is a village in Miankuh-e Moguyi Rural District of the Central District in Kuhrang County, Chaharmahal and Bakhtiari province, Iran. Birahgan or Birgan means "the roadless land," referencing the rough, mountainous terrain of the region.

== Demographics ==
=== Ethnicity ===
The village is populated by Bakhtiari Lurs.

=== Population ===
At the time of the 2006 National Census, the village's population was 195 in 37 households. The following census in 2011 counted 218 people in 55 households. The 2016 census measured the population of the village as 213 people in 51 households.
