= Golak =

Golak may refer to:

== Places ==
- Golak, Chaharmahal and Bakhtiari, Iran
- Golak, Gilan, Iran
- Golak, Sofia Province, Bulgaria
- Golak (region), Serbia

== Other uses ==
- Golak (Sikhism), a donation box used at Sikh temples
