= Shahrak-e Emam Hoseyn =

Shahrak-e Emam Hoseyn (Persian: شهرك امام حسين) may refer to:

- Shahrak-e Emam Hoseyn, Chaharmahal and Bakhtiari
- Shahrak-e Emam Hoseyn, Khuzestan
