= Doab Rural District =

Doab Rural District (Persian: دهستان دوآب) may refer to:

- Doab Rural District (Kuhrang County)
- Doab Rural District (Lorestan Province)
