= Isfahan Healthcare city =

- شهرک سلامت اصفهان

General information
- Coordinates: 32°40′58″N 51°44′23″E

Website
- https://isfahanhealthcarecity.com/

Isfahan Healthcare city is a complex built close to Aghababaei highway, Isfahan, consisting of a hospital with 1000 beds with the goal of earning revenue from medical tourism. It is in District 10 and built by Municipality of Isfahan with an Italian corporation.

== See also ==
- Economy in Isfahan
