= Culture in Isfahan =

Culture of Esfahan

In 2006 Isfahan was named Cultural Capital of the Islamic world, by the Organization of the Islamic Conference. Isfahan is the home of several UNESCO World Cultural Heritage Sites. The Naqsh-e Jahan Square (Shah Square) was built in the early 16th century when Isfahan was the capital of the Safavid empire, and it was one of the first sites in Iran to be inscribed on the World Heritage list, in 1979, and the Jameh Mosque of Isfahan was designated a World Cultural Heritage site in 2012. In addition, the Chehel Sotoun Palace in Isfahan is one of the nine sites around Iran that is part of the World Cultural Heritage site Persian gardens, inscribed on the list in 2011.

The University of Isfahan Entertainment Industry Innovation Center offers education in computer game design and development. Municipality of Isfahan Social, Cultural and Sports Organization (established in 1997) is one of the affiliated organizations of Isfahan Municipality.

There are more than 100 cultural and sports centers in the city. Isfahan joined the UNESCO Creative Cities Network in 2015.

== Gallery ==
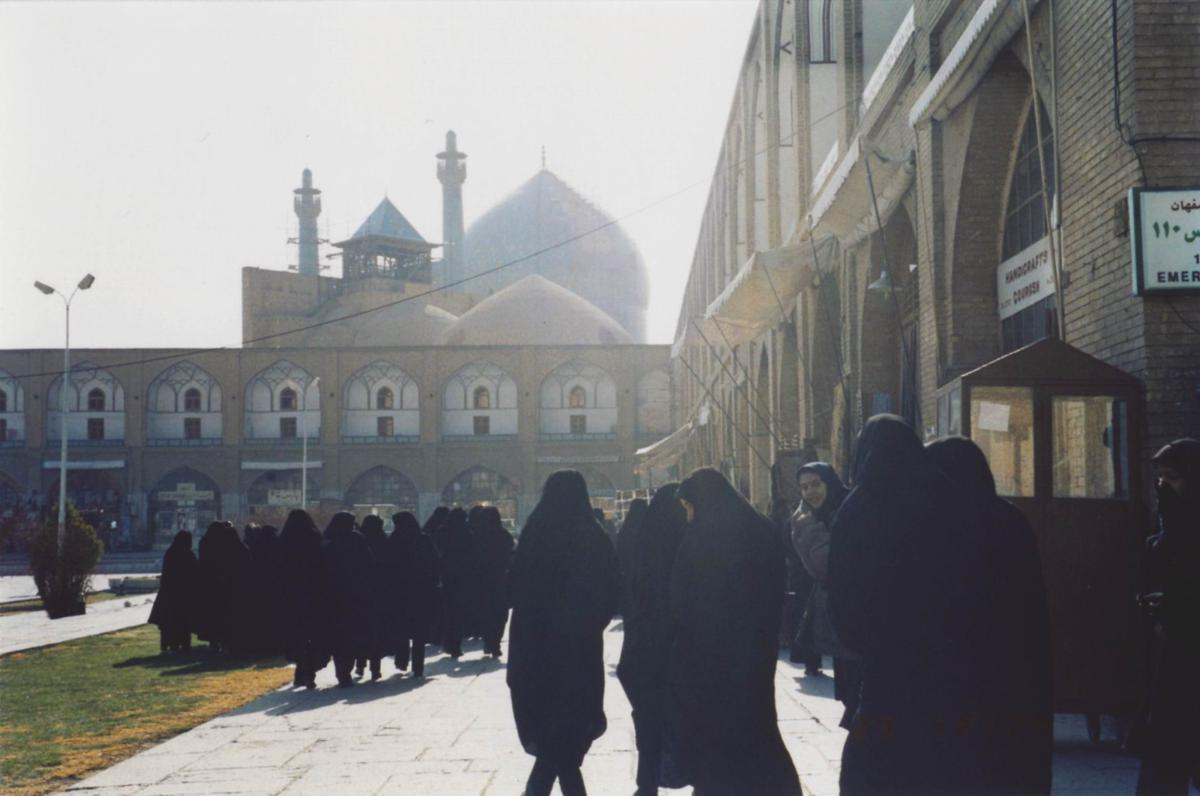
Isfahan

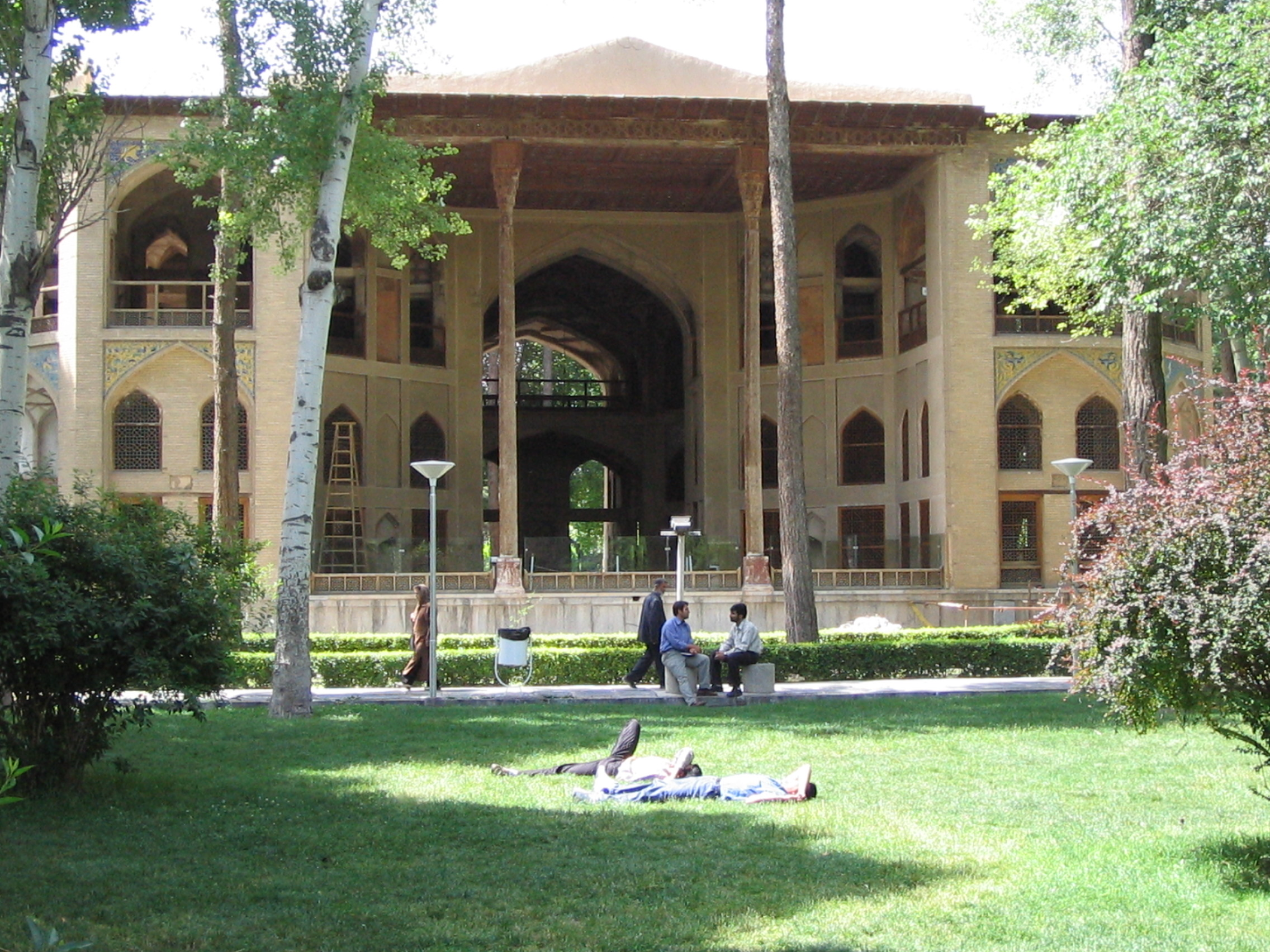
Hasht Behesht

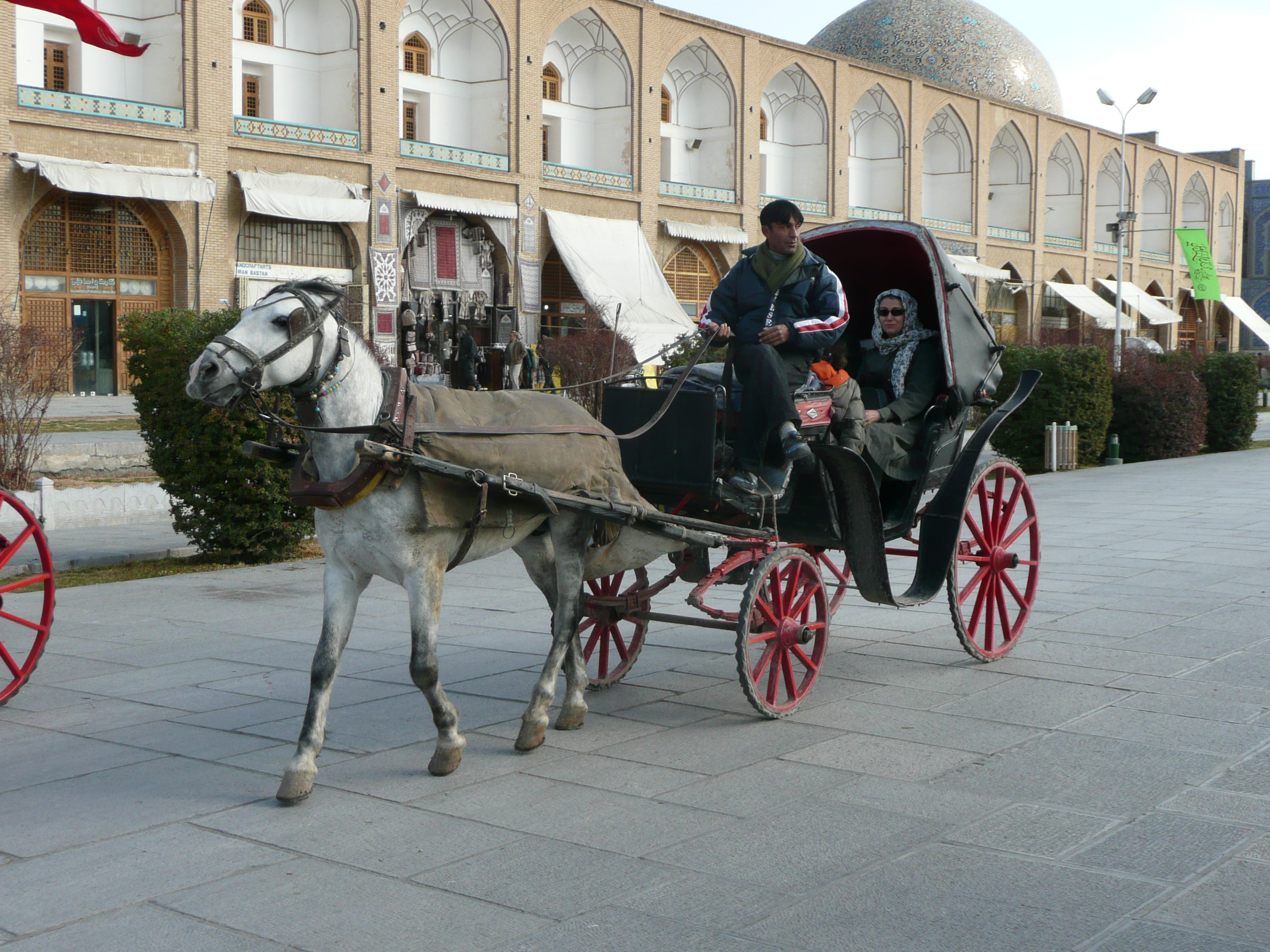
Horse shah abas square

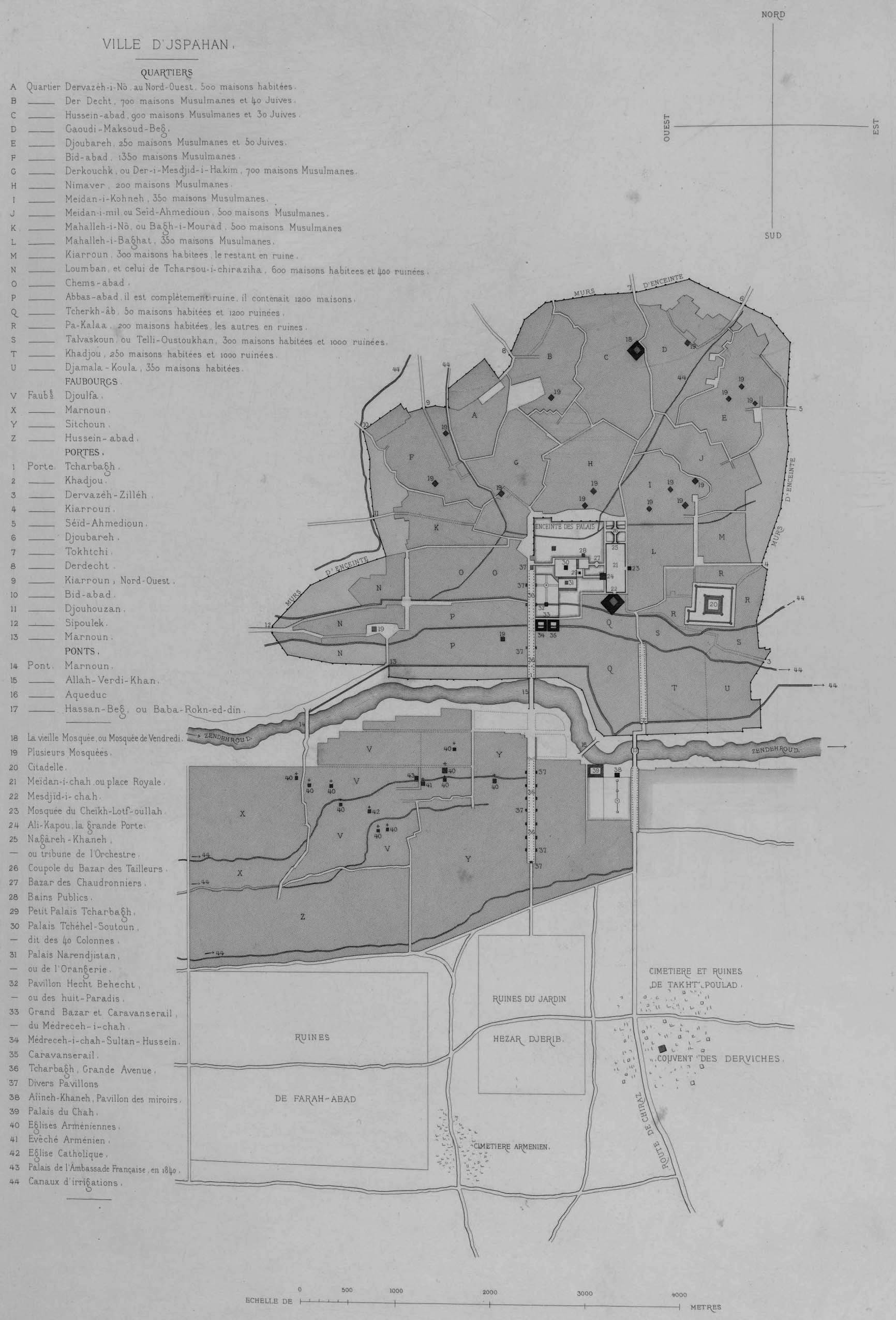
map by Coste

== See also ==
- Category:Tourist attractions in Isfahan
- Economy in Isfahan
