= Qaleh-ye Kushkak =

Village in Chaharmahal and Bakhtiari province, Iran

Qaleh-ye Kushkak Persian: قلعه کوشکک
- Village
- Location within Iran
- Coordinates: 32°26′01″N 50°12′09″E
- Country: Iran
- Province: Chaharmahal and Bakhtiari
- County: Kuhrang
- District: Central
- Rural District: Shurab-e Tangazi

Population (2016)
  - Total: 797
- Time zone: UTC+3:30 (IRST)

Qaleh-ye Kushkak (Persian: شهرك امام حسين) (Note: Also romanized as Qal’eh-ye Kūshkak; formerly known as Shahrak-e Emam Hoseyn (شهرك امام حسين), also romanized as Shahrak-e Emām Ḩoseynʿ; also known as Emāmḩoseyn) is a village in Shurab-e Tangazi Rural District of the Central District in Kuhrang County, Chaharmahal and Bakhtiari province, Iran.

== Demographics ==
=== Population ===
At the time of the 2006 National Census, the village's population (as Shahrak-e Emam Hoseyn) was 974 in 164 households. The following census in 2011 counted 1,120 people in 260 households, by which time the village's name had been changed to Qaleh-ye Kushkak. The 2016 census measured the population of the village as 797 people in 228 households. It was the most populous village in its rural district.
