= Shahriari Rural District (Kuhrang County) =

Rural district in Chaharmahal and Bakhtiari province, Iran

Shahriari Rural District Persian: دهستان شهریاری
- Rural District
- Location within Iran
- Coordinates: 32°16′N 50°16′E
- Country: Iran
- Province: Chaharmahal and Bakhtiari
- County: Kuhrang
- District: Doab Samsami
- Established: 2009
- Capital: Shahriari

Population (2016)
  - Total: 1,374
- Time zone: UTC+3:30 (IRST)

Shahriari Rural District (Persian: دهستان شهریاری) is in Doab Samsami District of Kuhrang County, Chaharmahal and Bakhtiari province, Iran. Its capital is the village of Shahriari.

== History ==
In 2009, Doab Rural District was separated from Bazoft District in the formation of Doab Samsami District, and Shahriari Rural District was created in the new district.

== Demographics ==
=== Population ===
At the time of the 2011 National Census, the rural district's population was 507 inhabitants in 141 households. The 2016 census measured the population of the rural district as 1,374 in 430 households. The most populous of its 37 villages was Bidamin, with 195 people.

=== Other villages in the rural district ===
- Darkabad
- Golabad
- Hajji Jalil
