= Biabeh =

Biabeh بي آبه
- Village
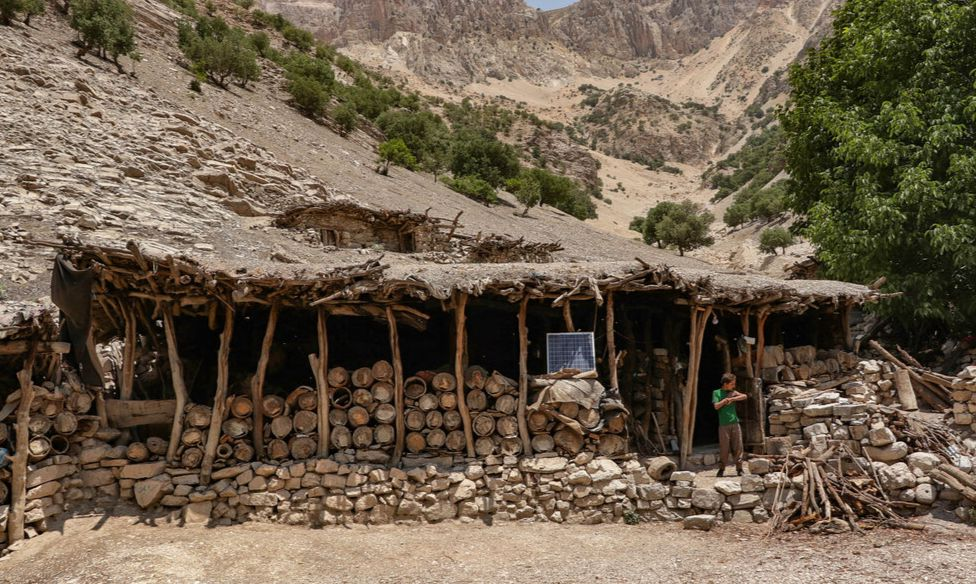

- Location within Iran
- Coordinates: 32°40′06″N 49°47′40″E
- Country: Iran
- Province: Chaharmahal and Bakhtiari
- County: Kuhrang
- Bakhsh: Central
- Rural District: Miankuh-e Moguyi

Population (2006)
  - Total: 62
- Time zone: UTC+3:30 (IRST)
  - Summer (DST): UTC+4:30 (IRDT)

Biabeh (Persian: بي آبه, also Romanized as Bīābeh; also known as Bīābehzir) is a village in Miankuh-e Moguyi Rural District, in the Central District of Kuhrang County, Chaharmahal and Bakhtiari Province, Iran. At the 2006 census, its population was 62, in 10 families. The village is populated by Lurs.

== Gallery ==
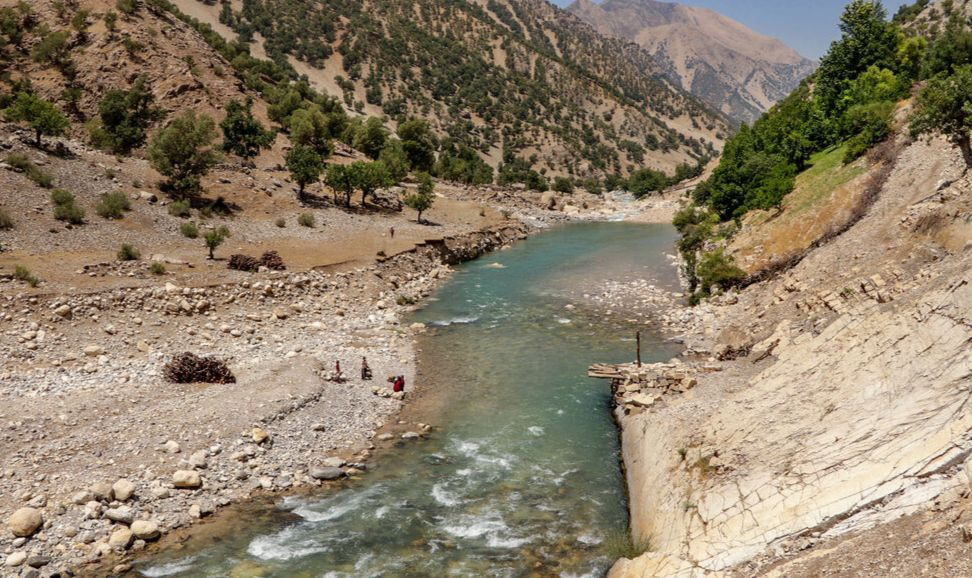

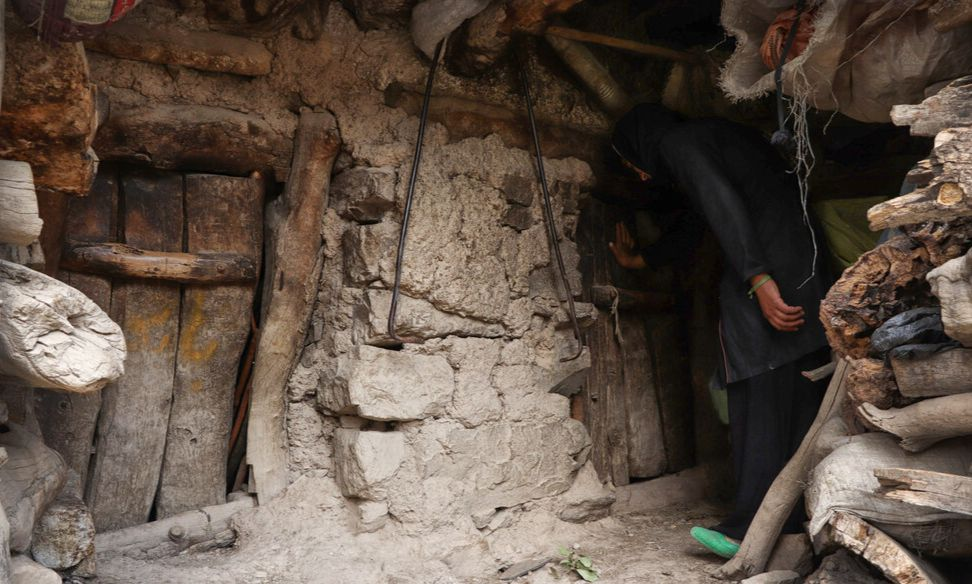

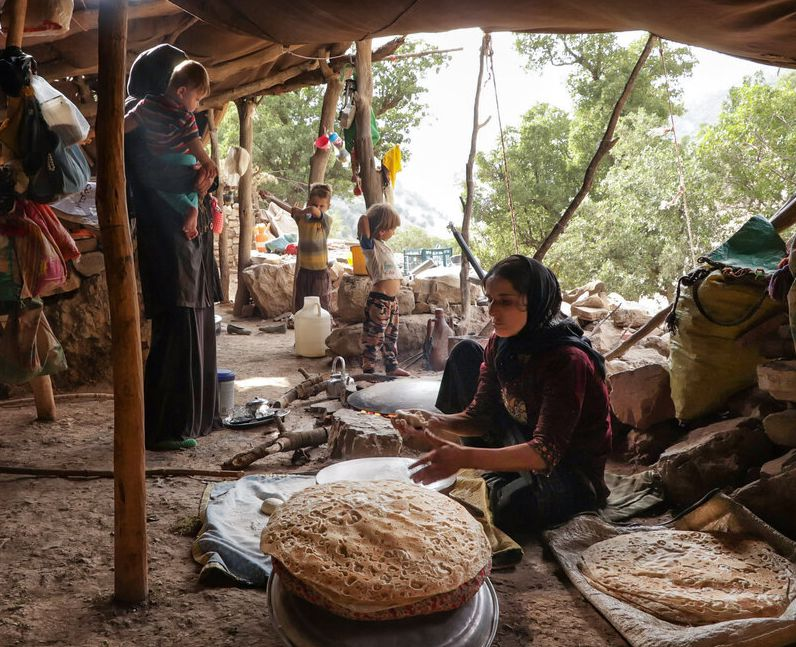

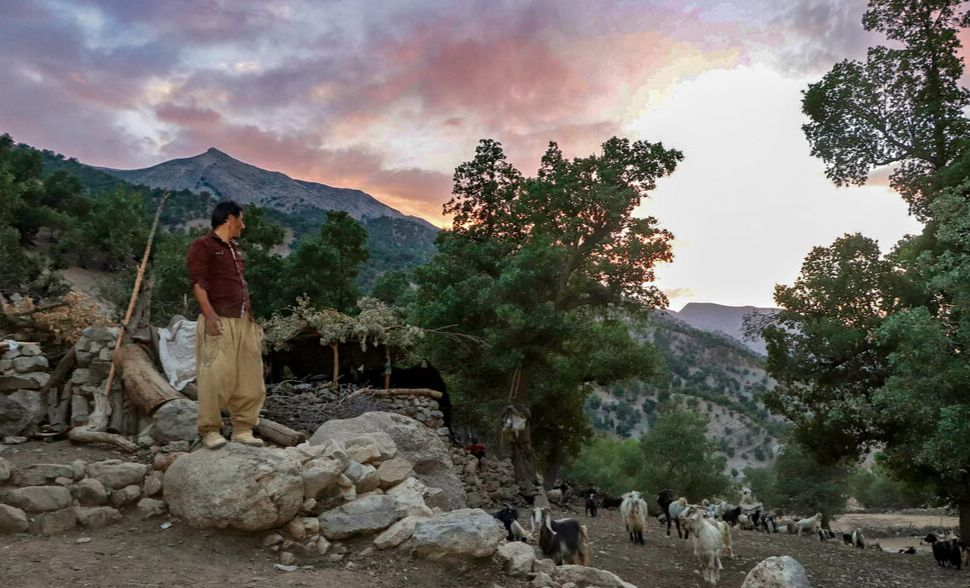

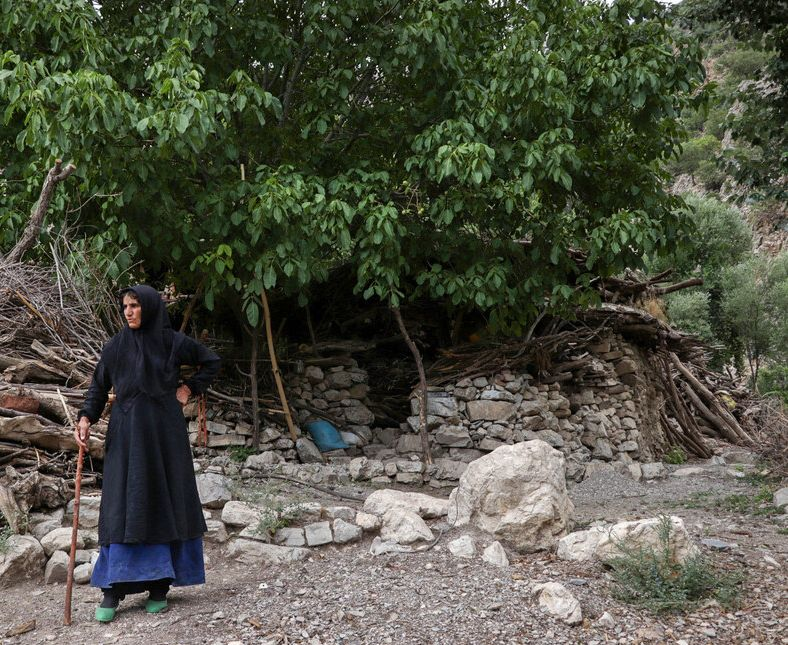
