= Tellow =

Tellow or Talu (Persian: تلو) may refer to:

- Talu, Chaharmahal and Bakhtiari
- Tellow-e Bala, Tehran Province
- Tellow-e Pain, Tehran Province
