= Economy in Isfahan =

Economy of Isfahan
- Currency: Iranian rial ريال

Statistics
- Main industries: iron, steel, mining, export, infrastructure building
- All values, unless otherwise stated, are in US dollars.

Commerce has always been central to the growth of Isfahan, to the extent that the Safavid Shah Abbas I (1588–1629) effectively re-routed the Silk Road through Isfahan. As of 2019, economic transparency is lacking in Isfahan. The Association of Mass Builders of Housing and Construction is an institution to encourage professionalism and create a suitable platform for investment. The Isfahan 1405 (2026) strategic plan is the sixth five-year plan of the city that has been uploaded on the municipal transparency site, and citizens can view it.

== Production ==
Since Safavid times, goldsmithing, carpet weaving, textile, and coppersmithing became popular in Isfahan. Jey Oil Refining Company has a production and storage site in Isfahan. City is a furniture production hub in the country. Some of the industrial districts within a 50-kilometer radius of the city are Jey Industrial Estate, Sagzi, Mohammad Abad, Dowlatabad, Isfahan. Some of the markets are Shoes, Bags, Cars, Computers, Home appliances, Food, Pharmaceuticals and Gardening. Isfahan is known for the Isfahan rug.

Notable companies based in Isfahan include:

- Solomon Carpet
- Esfahan Steel Company
- Defense Industry Complex, Isfahan
- Isfahan Tree Research Centre
- Milk and Meat Company, Isfahan
- Sepahan Factory Town Complex
- Isfahan Refrigerated Produce Company
- Hoseynabad va Mahmudabad Industrial Estate of Isfahan
- Isfahan Airport Industries

== Technology and infrastructure ==
For reducing unemployment, according to Tasnim, it is recommended to build a dry port for goods, in special economics logistics east region of the city because of the airport, railway, highways, and roads. Isfahan uranium processing facility is responsible for nuclear enrichment. Construction began in 1993. Montazeri Power Plant is located in the north of Isfahan next to the Oil Refinery. The plant has eight units of 200 megawatts, with a production capacity of 1600 megawatts in total. Startup Grind Isfahan hosts monthly startup events. Isfahan Science and Technology Town is one of the technology parks in Iran, and Isfahan University of Medical Sciences Health Science and Technology Park opened 2019.

== Recreation ==
List of hotels
Number	Name	Stars
1	Abbasi Hotel	5
2	Kosar	5
3	Piruzi	4
4	AliQapu	4
5	Venus	4
6	Keryas	4
7	Aseman	4

=== Sport clubs ===
- Foolad Mahan Isfahan BC
- Sepahan Novin F.C.
- Zob Ahan Isfahan BC
- Giti Pasand Isfahan FSC
- Sepahan Isfahan FC

=== Tourism ===
There are almost 150 hotels, Sarouyeh is a chosen tourism area in Isfahan Province.

== Wealth and distribution ==
Some of the special markets inside the city are the medicinal herbs market, flower & plants market, fish market, meat market. There is a program to build Kowsar hypermarkets in every district by Isfahan Municipality's Organization for Organizing Urban Jobs and Agricultural Products. In 2019 680 child workers were identified by charity groups. District 14 is one of the most impoverished places in the city with the highest number of children under 14 and a high crime ratio. Oman Samani neighborhood with a population density of 222 people per hectare and 55% of immigrants has the highest population density in Isfahan.

== Gallery ==
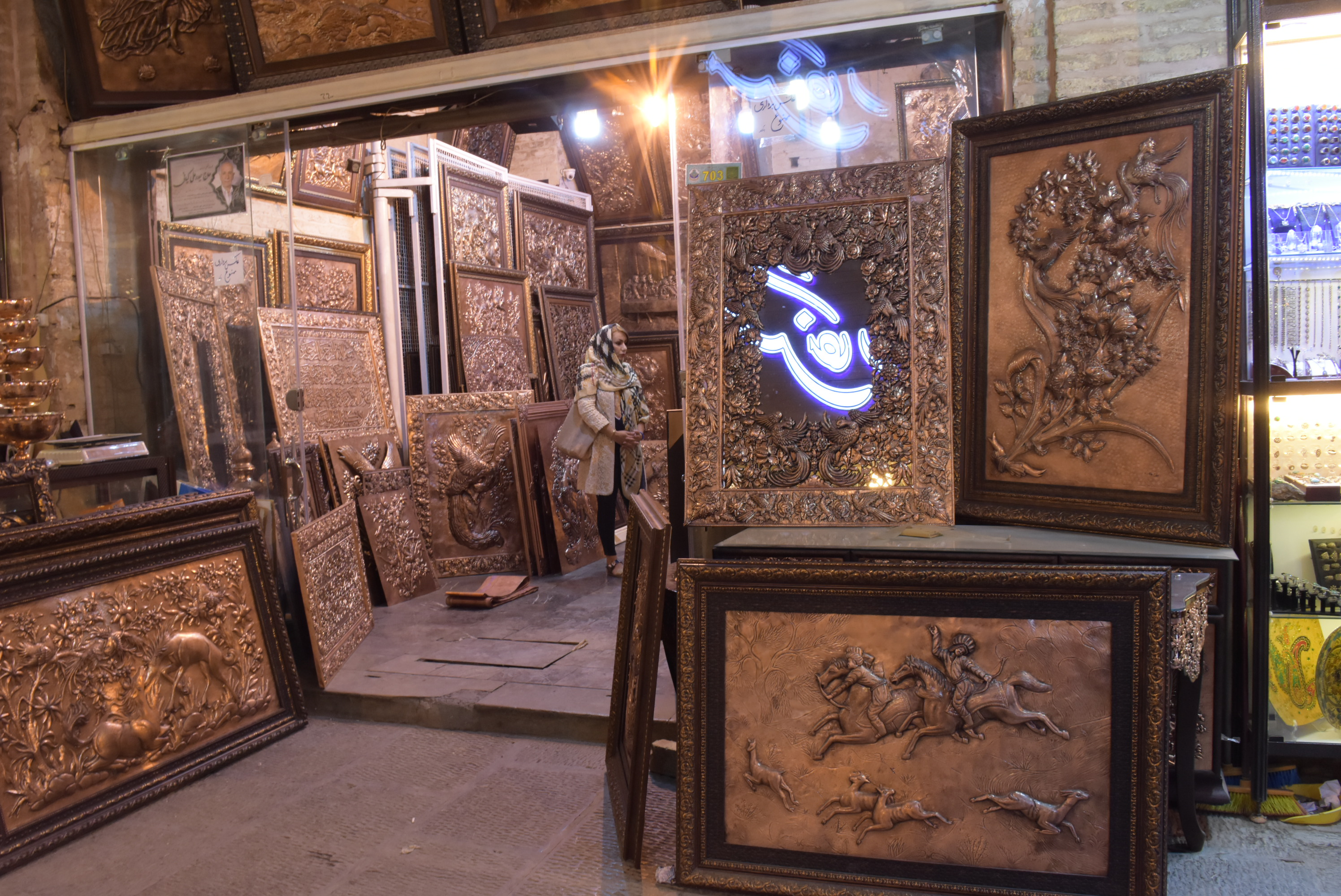
Market Esfahan

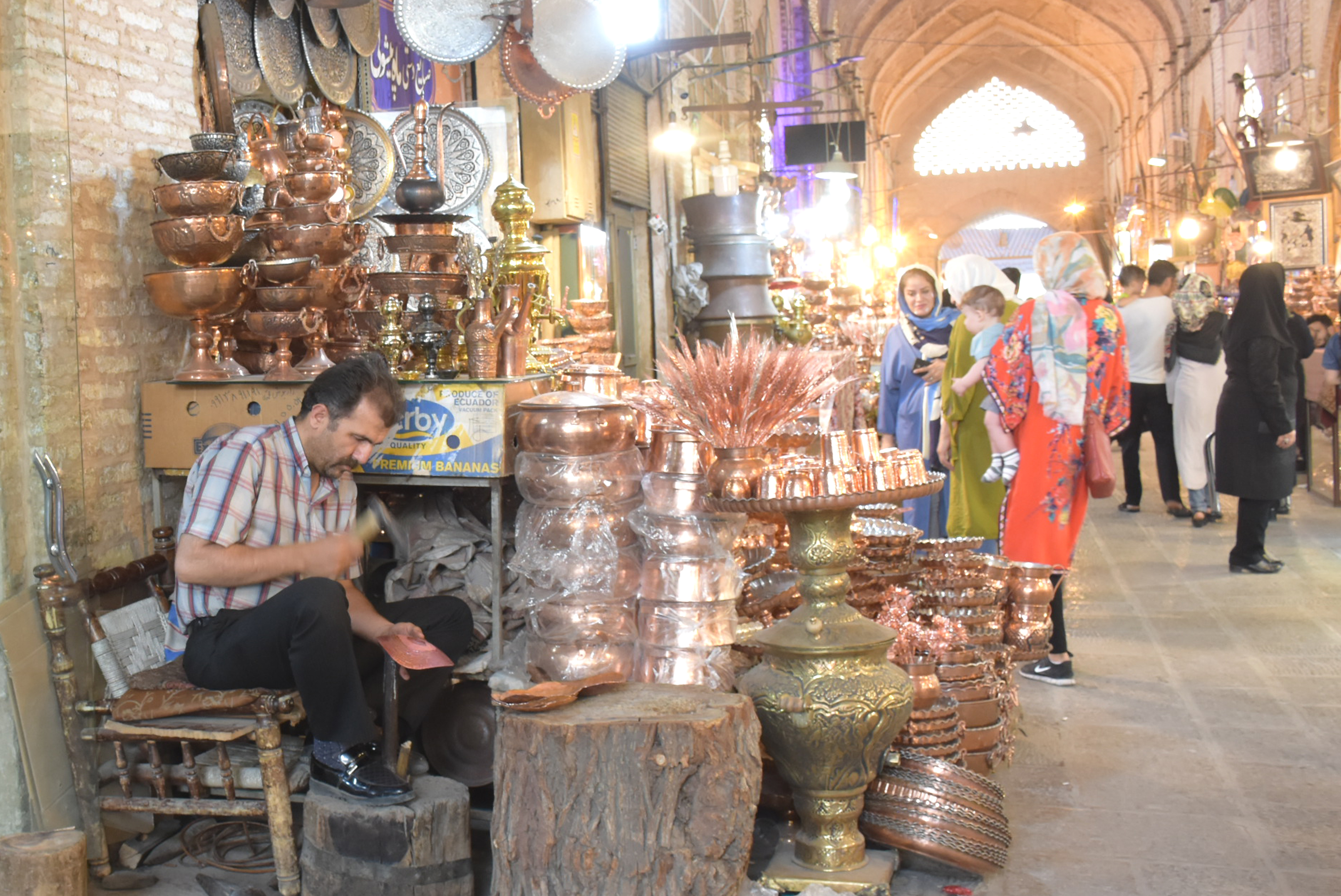
Market Esfahan

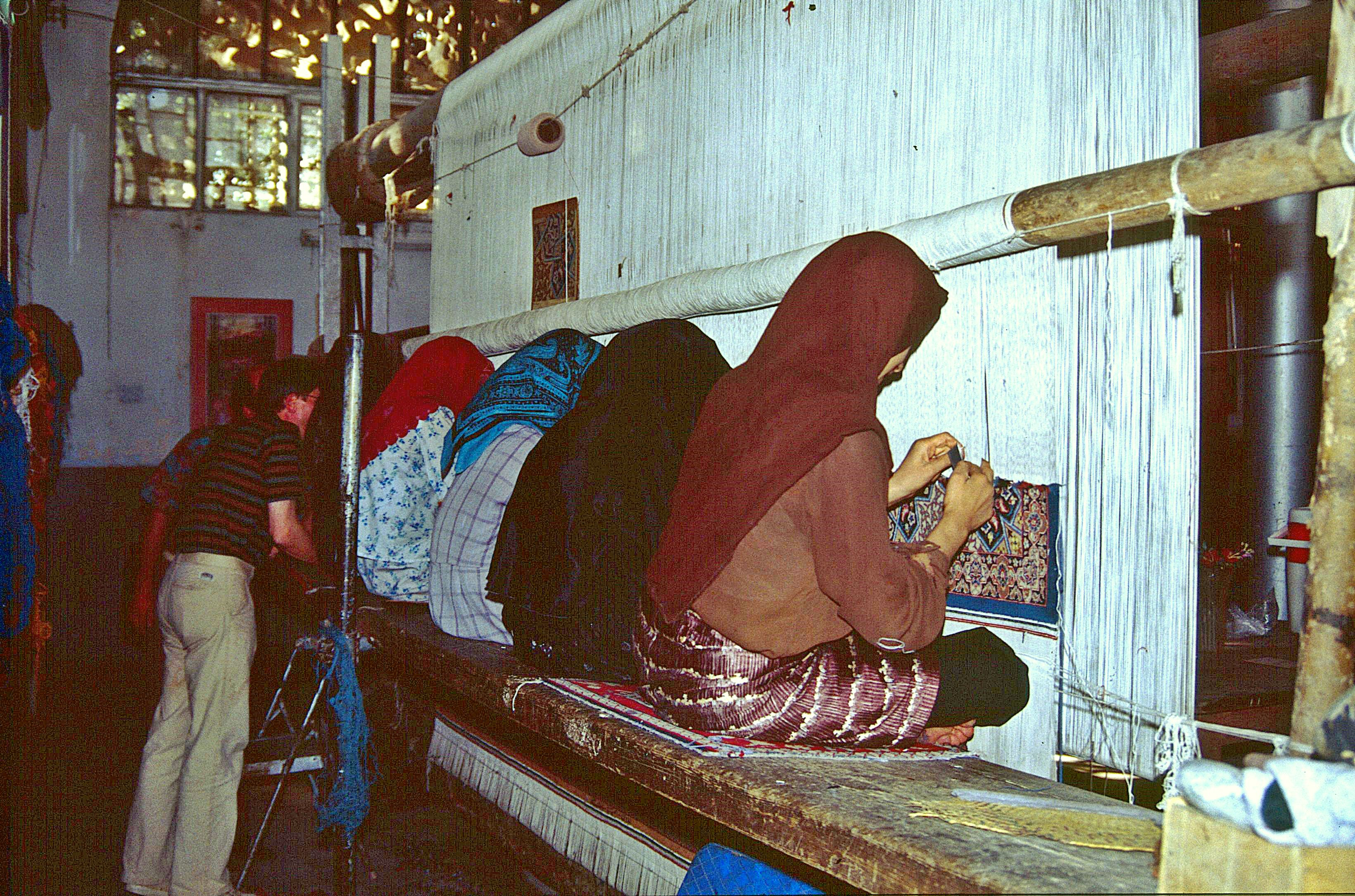
Carpet weaving

== See also ==
- List of companies of Iran
- List of economic laws in Iran
- Ecology in Isfahan
- Iranian labor law
- Privatization in Iran
- Social class in Iran
- Trade in Iran's Safavid era
