= Samsami =

City in Chaharmahal and Bakhtiari province, Iran

Samsami Persian: صمصامی
- City
- Location within Iran
- Coordinates: 32°09′58″N 50°16′35″E
- Country: Iran
- Province: Chaharmahal and Bakhtiari
- County: Kuhrang
- District: Doab Samsami
- Established as a city: 2013

Population (2016)
  - Total: 1,203
- Time zone: UTC+3:30 (IRST)

Samsami (Persian: صمصامی) (Note: Also romanized as Şamşāmī) is a city in, and the capital of, Doab Samsami District in Kuhrang County, Chaharmahal and Bakhtiari province, Iran. It also serves as the administrative center for Doab Rural District.

== Demographics ==
=== Ethnicity ===
The city is populated by Lurs.

=== Population ===
At the time of the 2006 National Census, the city's population was 354 in 69 households, when it was a village in Doab Rural District of Bazoft District. The following census in 2011 counted 491 people in 100 households, by which time the rural district had been separated from the district in the formation of Doab Samsami District. The 2016 census measured the population of the city as 1,203 people in 365 households, when Samsami had been elevated to the status of a city.
