= Kouhrang 2 Hydroelectric Power Station =

Dam in Chaharmahal and Bakhtiari, Iran

Kouhrang Dam
- Location within Iran
- Interactive map of Kouhrang Dam
- Official name: Kouhrang Power Plant
- Country: Iran
- Location: Chelgard
- Coordinates: 32°27′10.63″N 50°08′48.23″E
- Purpose: Power, water supply
- Status: Operational
- Construction began: 2001
- Opening date: 2005
- Construction cost: US$39.5 million
- Owners: Iran Water and Power Resources Development Company

Dam and spillways
- Type of dam: Embankment, earth-fill
- Height: 15 m (49 ft)
- Length: 470 m (1,540 ft)

Reservoir
- Total capacity: 100,000 m^{3} (81 acre⋅ft)
- Normal elevation: 2,343 m (7,687 ft)

Power Station
- Commission date: 2002-2004
- Hydraulic head: 84 m (276 ft)
- Turbines: 3 x 11.17 MW Francis-type
- Installed capacity: 33.3 MW

The Kouhrang 2 Hydroelectric Power Station is located just south of Chelgard and about 69 km (43 mi) northwest of Shahrekord in Chaharmahal and Bakhtiari Province, Iran. The power station has an installed capacity of 33.3 MW and uses water diverted to the east from the Kouhrang River, via a small dam and the 2 km (1.2 mi) long Kouhrang 2 Tunnel, to produce power. Water from the Kouhrang is stored in a circular dam (Kouhrang 2 Dam) before being sent to the power station. The power station's three generators were commissioned between 2002 and 2004, the power plant were inaugurated in February 2005. Water discharged from the power station enters the Zayandeh River as part of a larger project to provide water to major cities like Isfahan. The intake for the power plant is located on the Kouhrang River (32°24′35.71″N 50°07′36.81″E) just downstream of the Kouhrang 1 Dam which also diverts water, via the 2,800 m (9,200 ft) long Kouhrang 2 Tunnel, to near Chelgard and was completed in 1953. The Kouhrang 3 Dam is planned downstream to regulate river flows and divert more water to the Zayandeh via the Kouhrang 3 Tunnel.

== See also ==
- List of power stations in Iran
- Dams in Iran
