= Kouhrang 1 Dam =

Dam in Chaharmahal and Bakhtiari, Iran

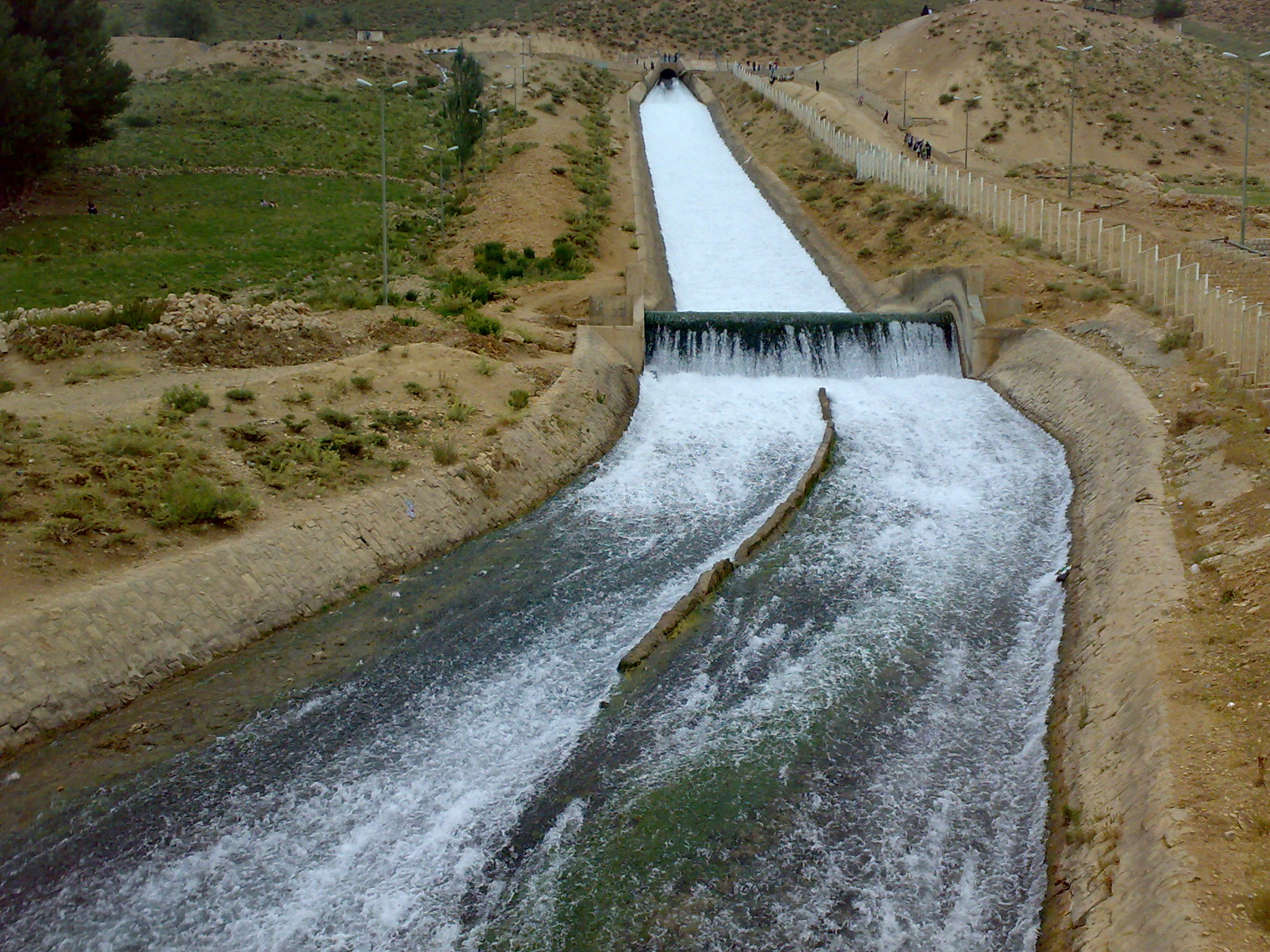
- Kouhrang Dam and Tunnel 1

- Location within Iran
- Interactive map of Kouhrang 1 Dam
- Country: Iran
- Location: Chelgard
- Coordinates: 32°26′10.97″N 50°06′04.48″E
- Purpose: Water supply
- Status: Operational
- Construction began: 1948
- Opening date: 1954

Dam and spillways
- Type of dam: Gravity, masonry
- Impounds: Kouhrang River
- Height: 10 m (33 ft)
- Length: 70 m (230 ft)

The Kouhrang 1 Dam is a masonry gravity dam on the Kouhrang River about 4 km (2.5 mi) southwest of Chelgard in Chaharmahal and Bakhtiari Province, Iran. The primary purpose of the dam is to divert up to 320,000,000 m^{3} (260,000 acre⋅ft) of water annually via the 2.8 km (1.7 mi) long Kouhrang 1 Tunnel to the Zayandeh River to the east where it would help supply cities like Isfahan with water. Since the era of Shah Abbas I, attempts had been made to diver the Kouhrang to the Zayandeh. Eventually, efforts by Alexander Gibb between 1948 and 1954 led to the completion of the Kouhrang 1 Dam and Tunnel.

== Gallery ==
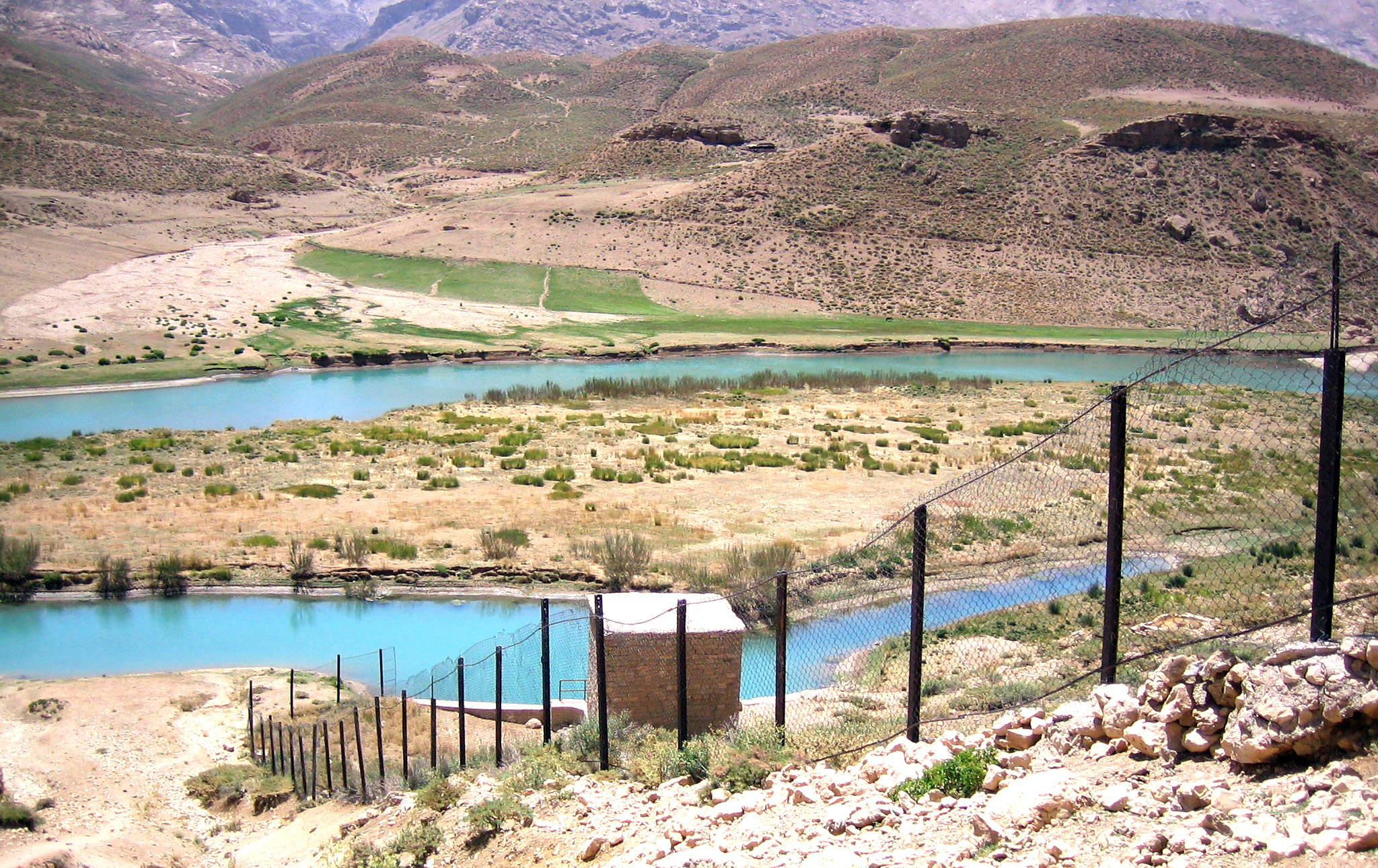
water entrance in Kouhrang tunnel

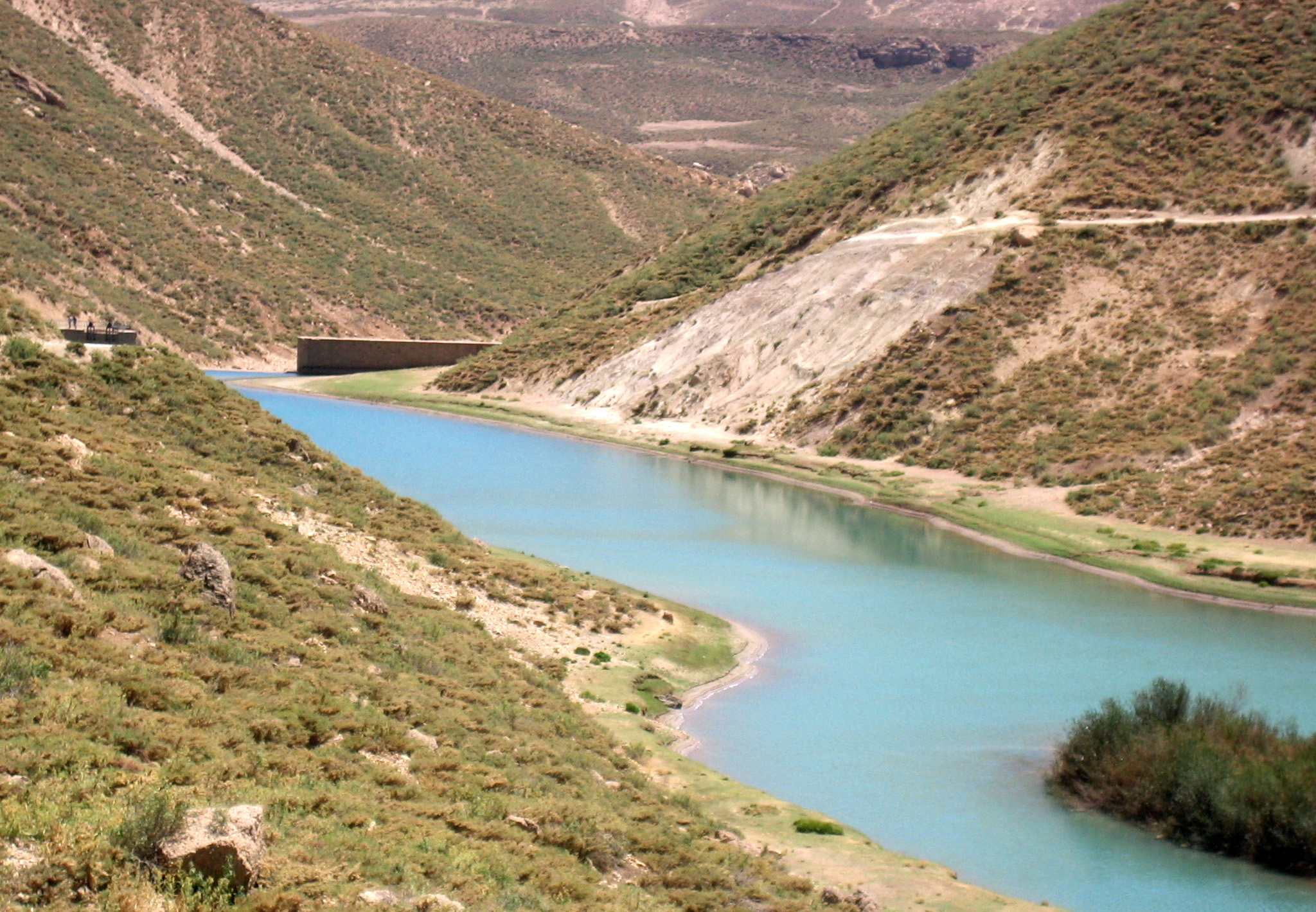
Kouhrang dam in summer

== See also ==
- Kouhrang 2 Dam – downstream, feeds water into the Kouhrang 2 tunnel
- Kouhrang 3 Dam – under construction downstream, feeds water into the Kouhrang 3 tunnel
