= Solomon Carpet =

Iranian carpet producer

Coordinates: 32.463886°N 51.917844°E

- Native name: قالی سلیمان
- Company type: Private Company
- Industry: Carpet, Textile products
- Founded: 1982
- Founder: Hasan Kardan, Hossein Asadi, Reza Monzavizadeh and Ali Kardanpour
- Headquarters: Isfahan, Iran
- Area served: Iran
- Key people: Reza Monzavizadeh, Founder and Chairman of the Board; Saeed Monzavizadeh, CEO; Hamid Monzavizadeh, Sales Manager; Navid Monzavizadeh, Export Manager; Ali Kardanpour, Factory Manager
- Products: Machine-made carpets; Silk Carpets; Polyester and Polypropylene yarns; Acrylic yarns
- Owner: Reza Monzavizadeh; Ali Kardanpour
- Number of employees: 1,150
- Website: www.solomon-carpet.com

Solomon Carpet (Persian: قالی سلیمان) is an Iranian acrylic and BCF yarn spinning and machine-made carpet producer located in Isfahan. This company is one of the leading manufacturers/exporters of machine-made carpets in the Middle East. The company registered as "Rasoul Isfahan Industrial Company" produces a variety of yarns and machine-made carpets in different sizes and patterns.

The company was founded in 1982 by Hassan Kardan, Hossein Asadi, Reza Monzavizadeh, Ali Kardanpour, and other partners in the historical city of Isfahan. The current owners of the company are Reza Monzavizadeh and Ali Kardanpour. Many countries such as Canada, the UK, Sweden, Russia, UAE, South Korea, Singapore, etc. use its exquisite silk carpets. In 2019, Reza Rahmani, Minister of Industry, Mine and Trade of Iran acknowledged this company as the prominent industrial unit of Isfahan province. Solomon Carpet has over 1,150 workers.

== Products ==
In 2019, the world's largest machine-made carpet with an area of 700 square meters and a density of 3600 was produced by the company to order in Oman. The carpet, which took 50 days to design and 30 days to weave and complete, was woven with 1 billion and 10 million knots. This carpet weighs two thousand kilograms and is used in the Sultan Qaboos Grand Mosque, the largest mosque in Salalah, Oman.Bank Melli Iran, one of the oldest and main banks in Iran, was the financial sponsor of this company.

This company produces various textile products, including:

- Various types of acrylic yarn
- Production of Polyester and Polypropylene yarns
- Production of machine-made carpets with acrylic staple, acrylic TOW, polyester, and polypropylene yarn in different grades
- Production of Silk carpets with density from 960 to 4500.
