= Gholamabad, Ilam =

Gholamabad غلام اباد
- Village
- Location within Iran
- Coordinates: 33°11′00″N 47°24′00″E
- Country: Iran
- Province: Ilam
- County: Darreh Shahr
- Bakhsh: Central
- Rural District: Zarrin Dasht

Population (2006)
  - Total: 165
- Time zone: UTC+3:30 (IRST)
  - Summer (DST): UTC+4:30 (IRDT)

Gholamabad (Persian: غلام اباد, also Romanized as Gholāmābād) is a village in Zarrin Dasht Rural District, in the Central District of Darreh Shahr County, Ilam Province, Iran. At the 2006 census, its population was 165, in 27 families. The village is populated by Kurds.
