= Talu Na Mohra =

- Town
- Location within Pakistan
- Coordinates: 33.26°N 73.27°E
- Country: Pakistan
- Province: (Islamabad Capital Territory) Islamabad C.T
- Elevation: 561 m (1,841 ft)

Population
  - Total: 66,618
- Time zone: UTC+5 (PST)

Talu Na Mohra is a town in the Islamabad Capital Territory of Pakistan. It is located at 33° 26' 45N 73° 27' 15E with an altitude of 561 metres (1843 feet).
