= Gholamabad-e Khayyat =

Gholamabad-e Khayyat غلام آباد خياط
- Village
- Location within Iran
- Coordinates: 33°54′11″N 48°02′27″E
- Country: Iran
- Province: Lorestan
- County: Selseleh
- Bakhsh: Firuzabad
- Rural District: Firuzabad

Population (2006)
  - Total: 96
- Time zone: UTC+3:30 (IRST)
  - Summer (DST): UTC+4:30 (IRDT)

Gholamabad-e Khayyat (Persian: غلام آباد خياط, also Romanized as Gholāmābād-e Khayyāţ; also known as Khayāt, Khayyāţ, and Khayyaţ-e Gholāmābād) is a village in Firuzabad Rural District, Firuzabad District, Selseleh County, Lorestan Province, Iran. At the 2006 census, its population was 96, in 17 families.
