= Gholamabad, Fars =

Gholamabad غلام اباد
- Village
- Location within Iran
- Coordinates: 27°35′23″N 52°45′19″E
- Country: Iran
- Province: Fars
- County: Mohr
- Bakhsh: Central
- Rural District: Arudan

Population (2006)
  - Total: 55
- Time zone: UTC+3:30 (IRST)
  - Summer (DST): UTC+4:30 (IRDT)

Gholamabad (Persian: غلام اباد, also Romanized as Gholāmābād) is a village in Arudan Rural District, in the Central District of Mohr County, Fars province, Iran. At the 2006 census, its population was 55, in 13 families.
