= Miankuh-e Moguyi Rural District =

Rural district in Chaharmahal and Bakhtiari province, Iran

Miankuh-e Moguyi Rural District Persian: دهستان میانکوه موگویی
- Rural District
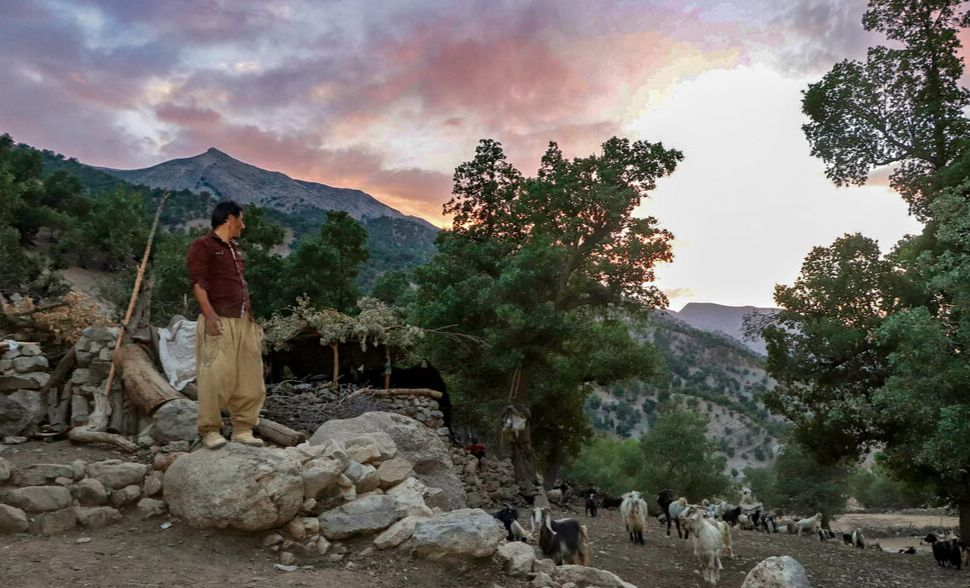
- Landscape in the village of Biabeh

- Location within Iran
- Coordinates: 32°42′N 49°49′E
- Country: Iran
- Province: Chaharmahal and Bakhtiari
- County: Kuhrang
- District: Central
- Established: 1993
- Capital: Khuyeh

Population (2016)
  - Total: 3,992
- Time zone: UTC+3:30 (IRST)

Miankuh-e Moguyi Rural District (Persian: دهستان میانکوه موگویی) is in the Central District of Kuhrang County, Chaharmahal and Bakhtiari province, Iran. Its capital is the village of Khuyeh.

== Demographics ==
=== Population ===
At the time of the 2006 National Census, the rural district's population was 3,781 in 624 households. There were 3,570 inhabitants in 754 households at the following census of 2011. The 2016 census measured the population of the rural district as 3,992 in 917 households. The most populous of its 16 villages was Sar Aqa Seyyed, with 1,698 people.

=== Other villages in the rural district ===
- Birahgan
- Sar Saleh Kutah

== Gallery ==
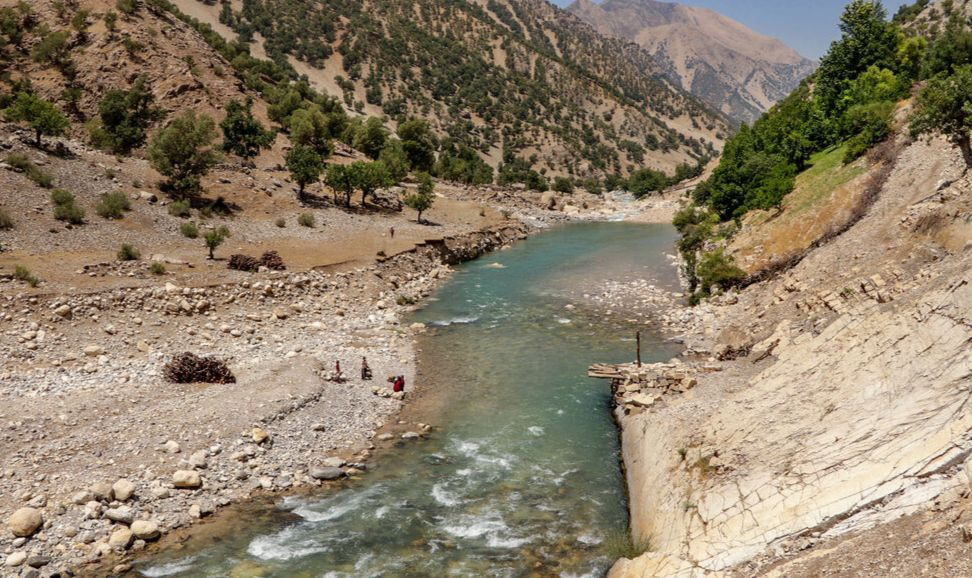
Biabeh village

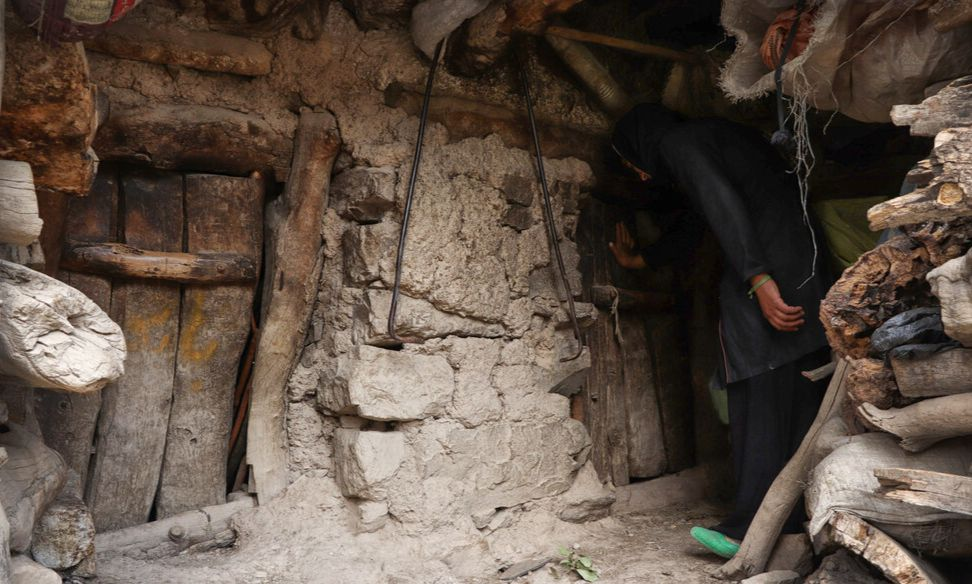
Biabeh village

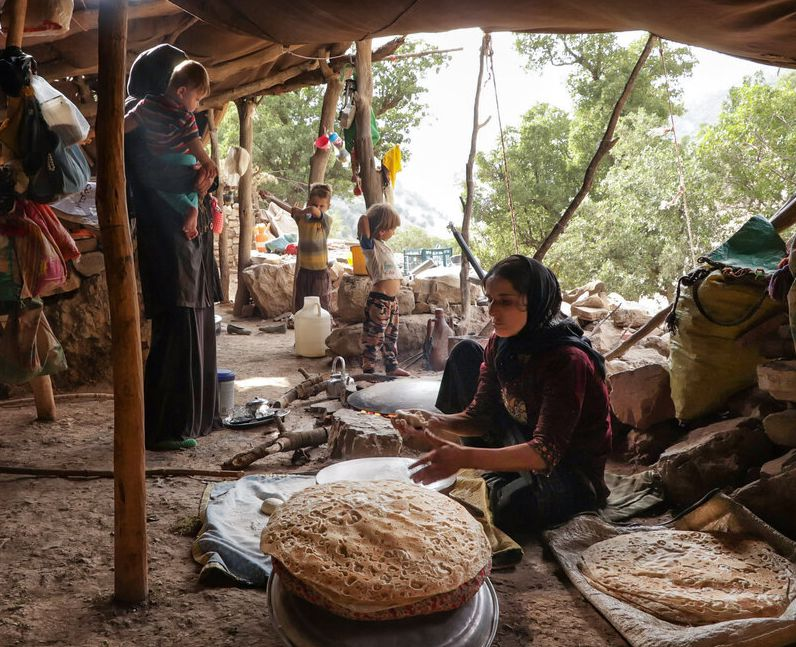
Biabeh village
