= Gordah, Hormozgan =

Gordah گرده
- Village
- Location within Iran
- Coordinates: 27°28′18″N 56°48′14″E
- Country: Iran
- Province: Hormozgan
- County: Bandar Abbas
- Bakhsh: Takht
- Rural District: Shamil

Population (2006)
  - Total: 411
- Time zone: UTC+3:30 (IRST)
  - Summer (DST): UTC+4:30 (IRDT)

Gordah (Persian: گرده; also known as Gerdū and Gordū) is a village in Shamil Rural District, Takht District, Bandar Abbas County, Hormozgan Province, Iran. At the 2006 census, its population was 411, in 85 families.
