= Chelgerd =

City in Chaharmahal and Bakhtiari province, Iran

Chelgerd Persian: چلگرد
- City
- Location within Iran
- Coordinates: 32°28′02″N 50°07′39″E
- Country: Iran
- Province: Chaharmahal and Bakhtiari
- County: Kuhrang
- District: Central
- Established as a city: 1999

Population (2016)
  - Total: 2,989
- Time zone: UTC+3:30 (IRST)

Chelgerd, Kuhrang

Chelgerd (Persian: چلگرد) (Note: Also romanized as Chelgard) is a city in the Central District of Kuhrang County, Chaharmahal and Bakhtiari province, Iran, serving as capital of both the county and district. It is also the administrative center for Shurab-e Tangazi Rural District. The village of Chelgerd was converted to a city in 1999.

== Demographics ==
=== Ethnicity ===
The city is populated by Lurs.

=== Population ===
At the time of the 2006 National Census, the city's population was 2,708 in 539 households. The following census in 2011 counted 3,061 people in 596 households. The 2016 census measured the population of the city as 2,989 people in 753 households.
