= Kouhrang 3 Dam =

Dam in Chaharmahal and Bakhtiari, Iran

- Interactive map of Kouhrang 3 Dam
- Country: Iran
- Status: Under construction
- Construction began: 2011

Dam and spillways
- Type of dam: Arch
- Impounds: Kouhrang River
- Height: 135 m (443 ft)
- Length: 235 m (771 ft)
- Width (crest): 5 m (16 ft)
- Width (base): 23 m (75 ft)

Reservoir
- Total capacity: 650,000,000 m^{3} (526,964 acre⋅ft)

The Kouhrang 3 Dam (سد کوهرنگ ۳, also known as Birgan dam بیرگان) is an arch dam currently under construction on the Kouhrang River in Chaharmahal and Bakhtiari province, Iran. It is located about 12 km (7.5 mi) northwest of Dashtak. The purpose of the dam is water supply and river regulation. Upstream of the dam will be the intake for the 23 km (14 mi) Kouhrang 3 Tunnel which will transfer water northeast to the Zayandeh River for use in major cities like Isfahan. Sabir Co. was awarded the contract for the dam's construction in February 2011 and construction began that same year. The diversion tunnels for the dam were completed in March 2013. The project was scheduled for completed in 2015.

As of July 2017, the project was not yet complete, though the tunnel was considered 97% finished, and newly allocated funds were expected to allow imminent completion. It is claimed that construction of the tunnel in difficult geological conditions has led to drying up of springs, and the estimated transfer volume has been reduced from 270–300 to 40–130 million cubic metres per year.

== See also ==
- Kouhrang 1 Dam – upstream, feeds water into the Kouhrang 1 tunnel
- Kouhrang 2 Dam – upstream, feeds water into the Kouhrang 2 tunnel
