= Koohrang =

River in Iran

Location
- Country: Iran

Physical characteristics
- Mouth
  - location: Karun River

Basin features
- River system: Karun River

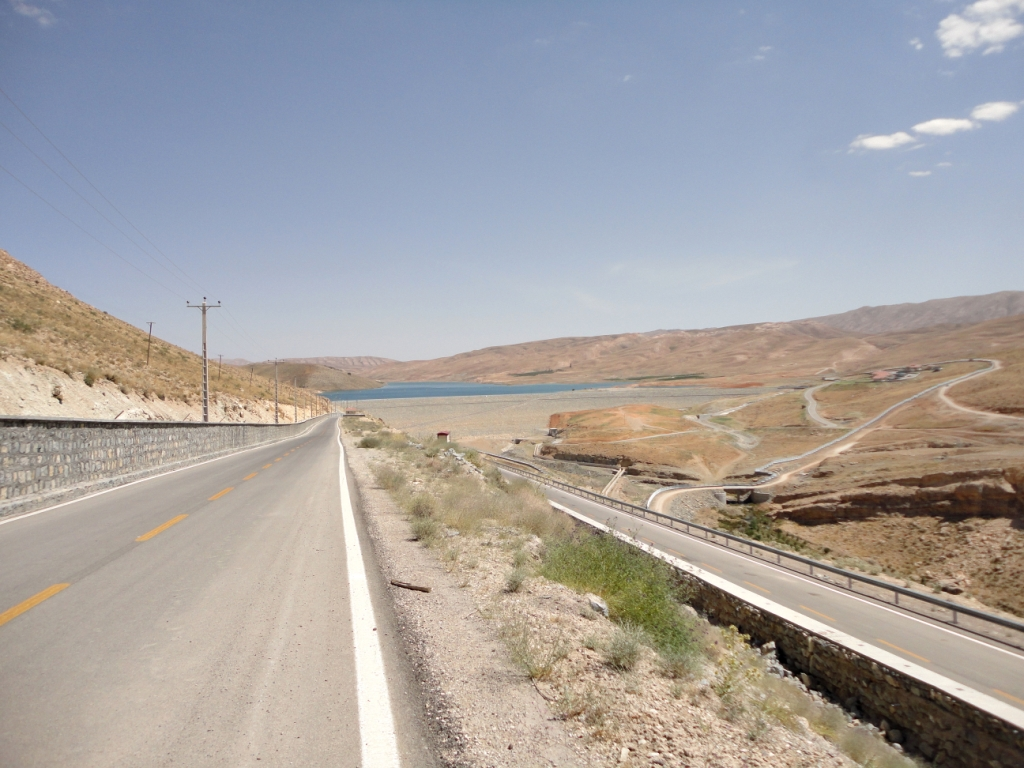
Semirom dam

The Koohrang (Persian: کوهرنگ), also known as Kouhrang and Kurang, is a river originating in the Zagros mountains of western Iran, which joins the Beheštābād river (32°00′44″N 50°36′37″E) to form the Karun, Iran's largest (by volume) river. A series of tunnels (Kuhrang Tunnels) have been built since the 1950s to redirect some of the Kuhrang's water toward the Zayandeh River to meet the demands of increased population in Esfahan and Yazd provinces.

The Zayandeh River basin encompasses about 41,500 square kilometres (16,000 sq mi) and is connected to the upper Karun River basin (which drains to the Persian Gulf) by the Kuhrang Dam and Tunnel 1 (32°26′10.94″N 50°06′04.50″E) constructed in 1953 although first proposed in the early sixteenth century. Two additional tunnels (Kurang 2 and Kurang 3) were constructed in late 1990s and early 2000s. A hydroelectric dam at Godar-e Langar (also known as Karun-4) would also supply piped water to Esfahan 300 kilometres (190 mi) away if it is completed (Whitley and Gallagher, 1995). Dams have deleterious effects on a riverine fish and other fauna and are often stocked with exotic species. The upper Karun has not been well explored for endemic taxa. Mean annual flow of the Zayandeh River is estimated at 1.2 to 1.45 cubic kilometres (970,000 to 1,180,000 acre⋅ft) and is used mostly for agriculture, but an increase in population and industry has necessitated dam construction (Chadegan Reservoir, capacity 1.45 cubic kilometres (0.35 cu mi)) and diversion schemes. There is also the Hana Dam on the Hana River at Semirom with a height of 35 metres (115 ft) and a capacity of 45 million cubic metres (1.6×10^{9} cu ft).
