= Shurab-e Tangazi Rural District =

Rural district in Chaharmahal and Bakhtiari province, Iran

Shurab-e Tangazi Rural District Persian: دهستان شوراب تنگزی
- Rural District
- Location within Iran
- Coordinates: 32°31′N 50°07′E
- Country: Iran
- Province: Chaharmahal and Bakhtiari
- County: Kuhrang
- District: Central
- Established: 1987
- Capital: Chelgerd

Population (2016)
  - Total: 5,431
- Time zone: UTC+3:30 (IRST)

Shurab-e Tangazi Rural District (Persian: دهستان شوراب تنگزی) is in the Central District of Kuhrang County, Chaharmahal and Bakhtiari province, Iran. It is administered from the city of Chelgerd.

== Demographics ==
=== Population ===
At the time of the 2006 National Census, the rural district's population was 5,562 in 1,068 households. There were 4,537 inhabitants in 1,058 households at the following census of 2011. The 2016 census measured the population of the rural district as 5,431 in 1,489 households. The most populous of its 46 villages was Qaleh-ye Kushkak, (Note: Formerly Shahrak-e Emam Hoseyn) with 797 people.

=== Other villages in the rural district ===
- Dehnow-e Olya
- Deymeh
- Mian Rudan-e Yek
