= Doab Rural District (Kuhrang County) =

Rural district in Chaharmahal and Bakhtiari province, Iran

Doab Rural District Persian: دهستان دوآب
- Rural District
- Location within Iran
- Coordinates: 32°10′N 50°18′E
- Country: Iran
- Province: Chaharmahal and Bakhtiari
- County: Kuhrang
- District: Doab Samsami
- Capital: Samsami

Population (2016)
  - Total: 3,353
- Time zone: UTC+3:30 (IRST)

Doab Rural District (Persian: دهستان دوآب) is in Doab Samsami District of Kuhrang County, Chaharmahal and Bakhtiari province, Iran. It is administered from the city of Samsami.

== Demographics ==
=== Population ===
At the time of the 2006 National Census, the rural district's population (as a part of Bazoft District) was 5,744 in 1,018 households. There were 3,558 inhabitants in 797 households at the following census of 2011, by which time the rural district had been separated from the district in the formation of Doab Samsami District. The 2016 census measured the population of the rural district as 3,353 in 1,131 households. The most populous of its 33 villages was Afsarabad, with 329 people.

=== Other villages in the rural district ===
- Dezak-e Olya
- Fakhrabad
