= Dasht-e Zarrin Rural District =

Rural district in Chaharmahal and Bakhtiari province, Iran

Dasht-e Zarrin Rural District Persian: دهستان دشت زرين
- Rural District
- Location within Iran
- Coordinates: 32°26′N 50°19′E
- Country: Iran
- Province: Chaharmahal and Bakhtiari
- County: Kuhrang
- District: Central
- Established: 1990
- Capital: Salehabad-e Zari

Population (2016)
  - Total: 7,810
- Time zone: UTC+3:30 (IRST)

Dasht-e Zarrin Rural District (Persian: دهستان دشت زرين) is in the Central District of Kuhrang County, Chaharmahal and Bakhtiari province, Iran. Its capital is the village of Salehabad-e Zari.

== Demographics ==
=== Population ===
At the time of the 2006 National Census, the rural district's population was 7,147 in 1,290 households. There were 7,051 inhabitants in 1,591 households at the following census of 2011. The 2016 census measured the population of the rural district as 7,810 in 2,136 households. The most populous of its 64 villages was Qaleh-ye Aliabad, with 929 people.

=== Other villages in the rural district ===
- Nasirabad
- Shahrak-e Miheh
