= Doab Samsami District =

District in Chaharmahal and Bakhtiari province, Iran

Doab Samsami District Persian: بخش دوآب صمصامی
- District
- Location within Iran
- Coordinates: 32°14′N 50°18′E
- Country: Iran
- Province: Chaharmahal and Bakhtiari
- County: Kuhrang
- Established: 2009
- Capital: Samsami

Population (2016)
  - Total: 5,930
- Time zone: UTC+3:30 (IRST)

Doab Samsami District (Persian: بخش دوآب صمصامی) is in Kuhrang County, Chaharmahal and Bakhtiari province, Iran. Its capital is the city of Samsami.

== History ==
In 2009, Doab Rural District was separated from Bazoft District in the formation of Doab Samsami District. The village of Samsami was converted to a city in 2013.

== Demographics ==
=== Population ===
At the time of the 2011 National Census, the district's population was 4,065 people in 938 households. The 2016 census measured the population of the district as 5,930 in 1,926 households.

=== Administrative divisions ===
Samsami District Population
Administrative Divisions	2011	2016
Doab RD	3,558	3,353
Shahriari RD	507	1,374
Samsami (city)		1,203
Total	4,065	5,930
RD = Rural District
