= Kuhrang County =

County in Chaharmahal and Bakhtiari province, Iran

Kuhrang County Persian: شهرستان کوهرنگ
- County
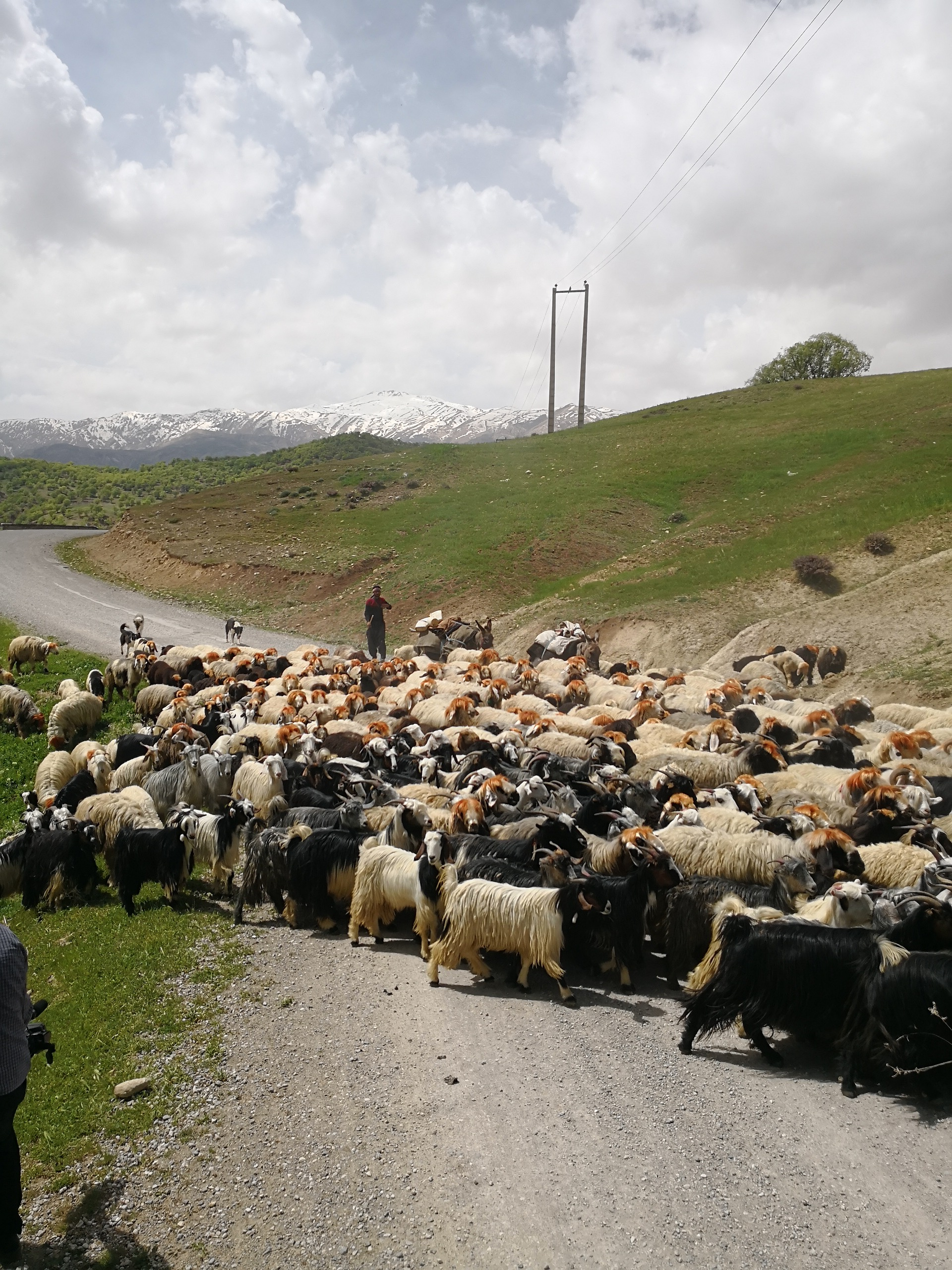
- Nomads herd sheep and goats near Bazoft in Kuhrang County

- Location of Kuhrang County in Chaharmahal and Bakhtiari province (left, yellow)

- Location of Chaharmahal and Bakhtiari province in Iran
- Coordinates: 32°24′N 49°59′E
- Country: Iran
- Province: Chaharmahal and Bakhtiari
- Established: 2001
- Capital: Chelgerd
- Districts: Central, Bazoft, Doab Samsami

Area
  - Total: 3,709 km^{2} (1,432 sq mi)

Population (2016)
  - Total: 41,535
  - Density: 11.20/km^{2} (29.00/sq mi)
- Time zone: UTC+3:30 (IRST)

Kuhrang County (Persian: شهرستان کوهرنگ) is in Chaharmahal and Bakhtiari province, Iran. Its capital is the city of Chelgerd.

== History ==
In 2009, Bazoft-e Bala Rural District was created in Bazoft District, and Doab Rural District was separated from it in the formation of Doab Samsami District, which was divided into two rural districts, including the new Shahriari Rural District.

In 2013, the village of Samsami was converted to a city, and two villages were merged to form the new city of Bazoft.

== Demographics ==
=== Population ===
At the time of the 2006 National Census, the county's population was 33,468 in 5,980 households. The following census in 2011 counted 35,915 people in 7,702 households. The 2016 census measured the population of the county as 41,535 in 10,859 households.

=== Administrative divisions ===
Kuhrang County's population history and administrative structure over three consecutive censuses are shown in the following table.

Kuhrang County Population
Administrative Divisions	2006	2011	2016
Central District	19,198	18,219	20,222
Dasht-e Zarrin RD	7,147	7,051	7,810
Miankuh-e Moguyi RD	3,781	3,570	3,992
Shurab-e Tangazi RD	5,562	4,537	5,431
Chelgerd (city)	2,708	3,061	2,989
Bazoft District	14,270	12,185	14,742
Bazoft-e Bala RD		3,305	4,144
Bazoft-e Pain RD (Note: Formerly Bazoft Rural District)	8,526	8,880	9,079
Doab RD	5,744		
Bazoft (city) (Note: Merger of two villages)			1,519
Doab Samsami District		4,065	5,930
Doab RD		3,558	3,353
Shahriari RD		507	1,374
Samsami (city)			1,203
Total	33,468	35,915	41,535
RD = Rural District

== Infrastructure ==
The county is the site of three dams and tunnels transferring water from the Kuhrang River to the Zayandeh River: Kouhrang 1, Kouhrang 2, and Kouhrang 3

== Tourism ==
Kuhrang County has many tourist attractions based on its environmental diversity, such as Kuhrang Spring, ice caves, Sheikh Ali Khan waterfall, and Dimeh Spring. The people of this county are Bakhtiari and speak Luri.

== See also ==
Media related to Kuhrang County at Wikimedia Commons
