= Central District (Kuhrang County) =

District in Chaharmahal and Bakhtiari province, Iran

Central District (Kuhrang County) Persian: بخش مرکزی شهرستان کوهرنگ
- District
- Location within Iran
- Coordinates: 32°34′N 50°01′E
- Country: Iran
- Province: Chaharmahal and Bakhtiari
- County: Kuhrang
- Established: 2001
- Capital: Chelgerd

Population (2016)
  - Total: 20,222
- Time zone: UTC+3:30 (IRST)

The Central District of Kuhrang County (Persian: بخش مرکزی شهرستان کوهرنگ) is in Chaharmahal and Bakhtiari province, Iran. Its capital is the city of Chelgerd.

== Demographics ==
=== Population ===
At the time of the 2006 National Census, the district's population was 19,198 in 3,521 households. The following census in 2011 counted 18,219 people in 3,999 households. The 2016 census measured the population of the district as 20,222 inhabitants living in 5,295 households.

=== Administrative divisions ===
Central District (Kuhrang County) Population
Administrative Divisions	2006	2011	2016
Dasht-e Zarrin RD	7,147	7,051	7,810
Miankuh-e Moguyi RD	3,781	3,570	3,992
Shurab-e Tangazi RD	5,562	4,537	5,431
Chelgerd (city)	2,708	3,061	2,989
Total	19,198	18,219	20,222
RD = Rural District

== Gallery ==
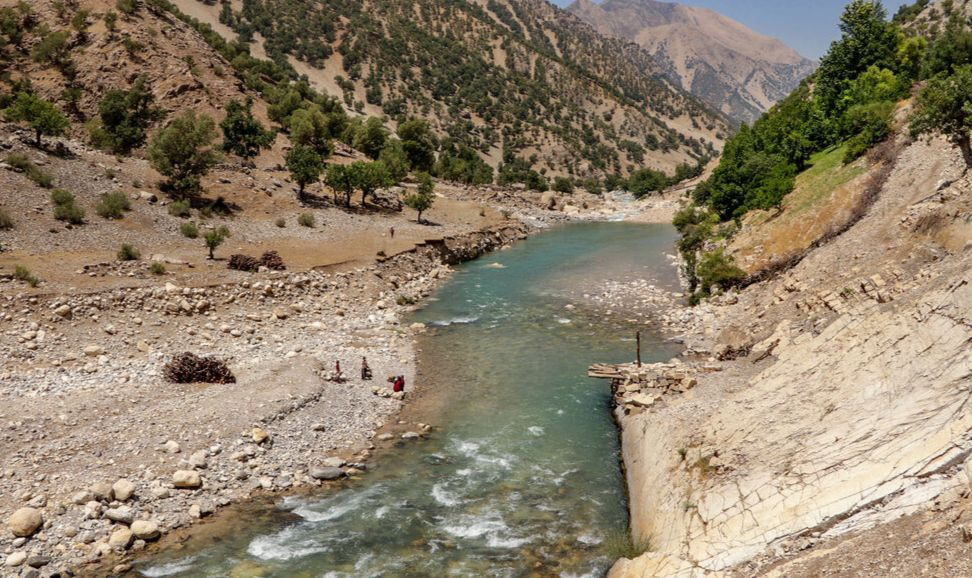
Biabeh village

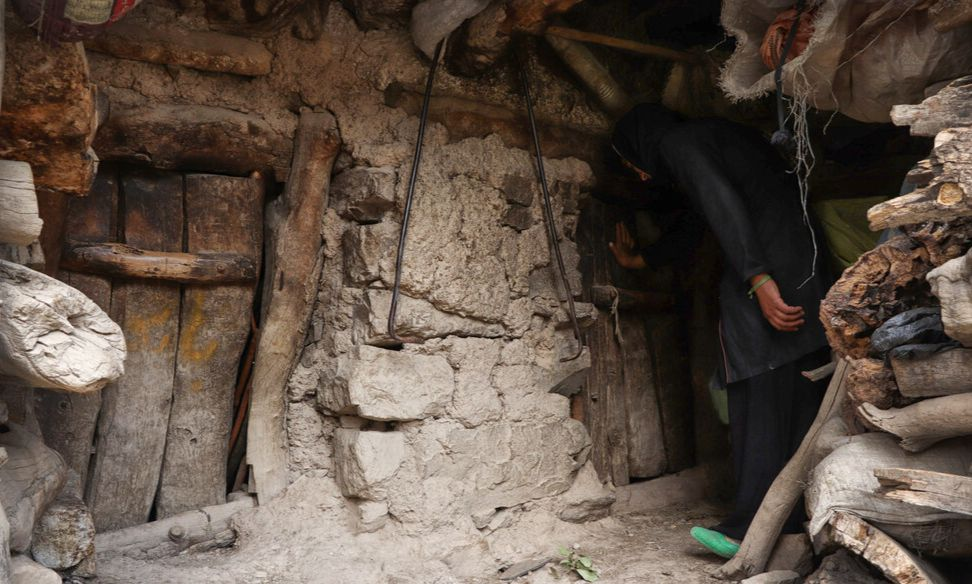
Biabeh village

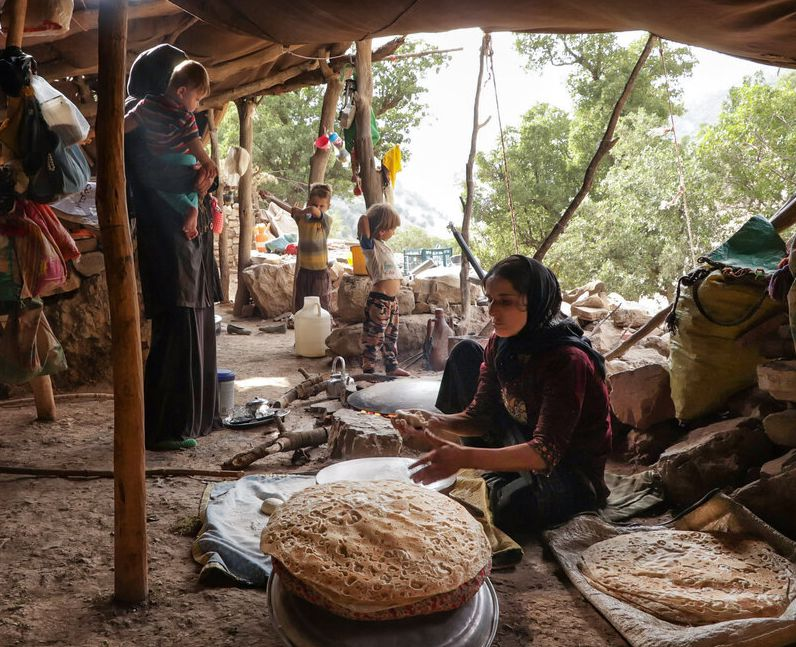
Biabeh village

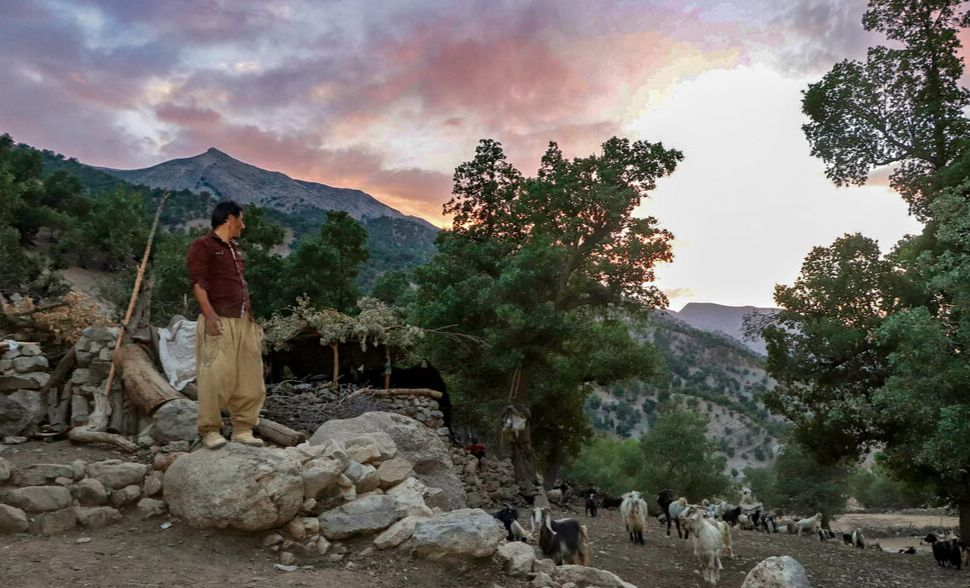
Biabeh village

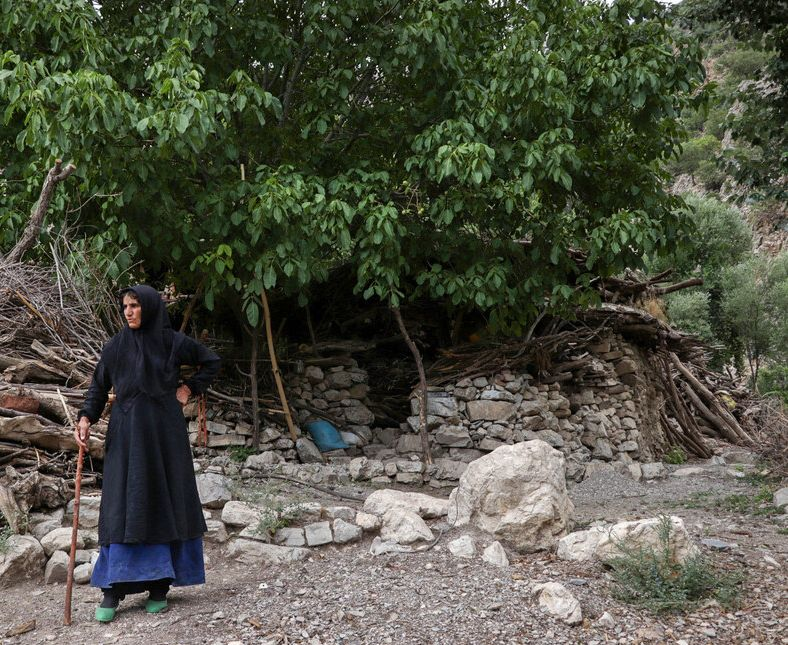
Biabeh village
