= Dam Tang =

Dam Tang or Dam-e Tang or Damtang (Persian: دمتنگ or دم تنگ) may refer to:

- Dam Tang, Chaharmahal and Bakhtiari
- Dam Tang-e Masri
- Dam Tang Chendar Chavil
- Damtang, Bagh-e Malek, Khuzestan Province
- Dam-e Tang-e Bavary, Kohgiluyeh and Boyer-Ahmad Province
- Dam Tang-e Chahen, Kohgiluyeh and Boyer-Ahmad Province
- Dam Tang-e Darrehna, Kohgiluyeh and Boyer-Ahmad Province
- Dam Tang-e Kap, Kohgiluyeh and Boyer-Ahmad Province
- Dam Tang-e Landeh, Kohgiluyeh and Boyer-Ahmad Province
- Dam Tang-e Miyan Tangan, Kohgiluyeh and Boyer-Ahmad Province
- Dam-e Tang-e Molghun, Kohgiluyeh and Boyer-Ahmad Province
- Dam Tang-e Nal Ashkenan-e Mahtab, Kohgiluyeh and Boyer-Ahmad Province
- Dam Tang-e Orveh, Kohgiluyeh and Boyer-Ahmad Province
- Dam Tang-e Sarna, Kohgiluyeh and Boyer-Ahmad Province
- Dam-e Tang-e Shahid Deli Bajak, Kohgiluyeh and Boyer-Ahmad Province
- Dam Tang-e Sheykh Sorkeh, Kohgiluyeh and Boyer-Ahmad Province
- Dam Tang-e Sulak, Kohgiluyeh and Boyer-Ahmad Province
- Dam Tang-e Tikab, Kohgiluyeh and Boyer-Ahmad Province
