= Chahar Rah =

Chahar Rah (Persian: چهارراه) may refer to various places in Iran:

- Chahar Rah-e Zirrah, Fars Province
- Chahar Rah, Isfahan
- Chahar Rah, Khuzestan
- Chahar Rah, Kohgiluyeh and Boyer-Ahmad
- Chahar Rah-e Ali Tayyeb, Kohgiluyeh and Boyer-Ahmad Province
- Chahar Rah Beheshti Sapu, Kohgiluyeh and Boyer-Ahmad Province
- Chahar Rah-e Soleyman, Kohgiluyeh and Boyer-Ahmad Province
- Chahar Rah, Razavi Khorasan
