= Bard Zard =

Bard Zard or Bardezard (Persian: بردزرد) may refer to:

- Bard Zard, Fars
- Bard Zard, Andika, Khuzestan Province
- Bard Zard, Bagh-e Malek, Khuzestan Province
- Bard Zard, Dehdez, Izeh County, Khuzestan Province
- Bard Zard, Susan, Izeh County, Khuzestan Province
- Bard Zard, Kohgiluyeh and Boyer-Ahmad
