= Duk =

Duk may refer to:

== Geography ==
- Duk, a former fort on the Mount of Temptation near Jericho in the West Bank
- Duk, Isfahan, a village in Isfahan Province, Iran
- Duk, Kohgiluyeh and Boyer-Ahmad, a village in Kohgiluyeh and Boyer-Ahmad Province, Iran
- Duk, Gachsaran, a village in Kohgiluyeh and Boyer-Ahmad Province, Iran
- Duk, Mazandaran, a village in Qaem Shahr County, Mazandaran Province
- Duk County, a county of Jonglei, South Sudan
- Duk River, part of the Chao Phraya River basin in Thailand
- Kaft Galleh Duk, a village with a population of 20 in Khuzestan Province, Iran
- Tha Pla Duk, a village and tambon of Mae Tha District, in Lamphun Province, Thailand

== Television ==
- Tiny and Mr Duk, two puppet characters from UK children's TV show, The Saturday Show by Dave Chapman and Damian Farrell

== Other uses ==
- Duk-Duk, a men-only secret society of the Tolai people of New Britain
- Donald Duk, a coming-of-age novel written by Frank Chin, first published in February 1991

== People ==
- Kim Duk (wrestler), Zainichi Korean wrestler
- Rafael Duk (born 1962/63), Mexican gridiron football coach
- Randall Duk Kim (born 1943), a Korean American stage, television and film actor
- Duk (footballer) (born 2000), association footballer

== See also ==
- DUK (disambiguation)
- Dook (disambiguation)
- Pla duk (disambiguation)
- Duck (disambiguation)
- Tteok, a class of Korean rice cakes often spelled as "ddeock", "duk", "dduk", "ddeog", or "thuck"
- Duke, a title of social class and nobility
