= Gurdalu-ye Ab Razgeh =

Gurdalu-ye Ab Razgeh گوردالوابرزگه
- Village
- Location within Iran
- Coordinates: 30°58′13″N 50°26′28″E
- Country: Iran
- Province: Kohgiluyeh and Boyer-Ahmad
- County: Landeh
- Bakhsh: Central
- Rural District: Tayebi-ye Garmsiri-ye Shomali

Population (2006)
  - Total: 24
- Time zone: UTC+3:30 (IRST)
  - Summer (DST): UTC+4:30 (IRDT)

Gurdalu-ye Ab Razgeh (Persian: گوردالوابرزگه, also Romanized as Gūrdālū-ye Āb Razgeh; also known as Gūrdālū) is a village in Tayebi-ye Garmsiri-ye Shomali Rural District, in the Central District of Landeh County, Kohgiluyeh and Boyer-Ahmad Province, Iran. At the 2006 census, its population was 24, in 4 families.
