= Dul Abza =

Dul Abza دول ابزا
- Village
- Location within Iran
- Coordinates: 30°54′00″N 50°20′00″E
- Country: Iran
- Province: Kohgiluyeh and Boyer-Ahmad
- County: Landeh
- Bakhsh: Central
- Rural District: Olya Tayeb

Population (2006)
  - Total: 78
- Time zone: UTC+3:30 (IRST)
  - Summer (DST): UTC+4:30 (IRDT)

Dul Abza (Persian: دول ابزا, also Romanized as Dūl Ābzā) is a village in Olya Tayeb Rural District, in the Central District of Landeh County, Kohgiluyeh and Boyer-Ahmad Province, Iran. At the 2006 census, its population was 78, in 15 families.
