= Darreh Zang =

Darreh Zang or Darreh-ye Zang (Persian: دره زنگ) may refer to:

- Darreh Zang, Dehdez, Khuzestan Province
- Darreh Zang, Susan, Khuzestan Province
- Darreh Zang, Kohgiluyeh and Boyer-Ahmad
