= Orveh =

Orveh (Persian: عروه) may refer to:

- Orveh-ye Olya
- Orveh-ye Sofla
- Orveh-ye Vosta
