= Gahgah Ahmad =

Gahgah Ahmad گه گه احمد
- Village
- Location within Iran
- Coordinates: 31°00′33″N 50°20′57″E
- Country: Iran
- Province: Kohgiluyeh and Boyer-Ahmad
- County: Landeh
- Bakhsh: Central
- Rural District: Tayebi-ye Garmsiri-ye Shomali

Population (2006)
  - Total: 18
- Time zone: UTC+3:30 (IRST)
  - Summer (DST): UTC+4:30 (IRDT)

Gahgah Ahmad (Persian: گه گه احمد, also Romanized as Gahgah Aḩmad; also known as Gacheh Aḩmad and Kageh Aḩmad) is a village in Tayebi-ye Garmsiri-ye Shomali Rural District, in the Central District of Landeh County, Kohgiluyeh and Boyer-Ahmad Province, Iran. At the 2006 census, its population was 18, in 5 families.
