= Barreh Mal =

Barreh Mal بره مال
- Village
- Location within Iran
- Coordinates: 30°56′12″N 50°14′55″E
- Country: Iran
- Province: Kohgiluyeh and Boyer-Ahmad
- County: Landeh
- Bakhsh: Central
- Rural District: Olya Tayeb

Population (2006)
  - Total: 175
- Time zone: UTC+3:30 (IRST)
  - Summer (DST): UTC+4:30 (IRDT)

Barreh Mal (Persian: بره مال, also Romanized as Barreh Māl; also known as Baramol) is a village in Olya Tayeb Rural District, in the Central District of Landeh County, Kohgiluyeh and Boyer-Ahmad Province, Iran. At the 2006 census, its population was 175, in 28 families.
