= Dam Eshkaft-e Muneh =

Dam Eshkaft-e Muneh دم اشكفت مونه
- Village
- Location within Iran
- Coordinates: 31°01′05″N 50°24′16″E
- Country: Iran
- Province: Kohgiluyeh and Boyer-Ahmad
- County: Landeh
- Bakhsh: Central
- Rural District: Tayebi-ye Garmsiri-ye Shomali

Population (2006)
  - Total: 67
- Time zone: UTC+3:30 (IRST)
  - Summer (DST): UTC+4:30 (IRDT)

Dam Eshkaft-e Muneh (Persian: دم اشكفت مونه, also Romanized as Dam Eshkaft-e Mūneh; also known as Dameshgaft and Dam Eshkaft) is a village in Tayebi-ye Garmsiri-ye Shomali Rural District, in the Central District of Landeh County, Kohgiluyeh and Boyer-Ahmad Province, Iran. At the 2006 census, its population was 67, in 14 families.
