= Malsheykh =

Malsheykh مال شيخ
- Village
- Location within Iran
- Coordinates: 30°58′45″N 50°23′17″E
- Country: Iran
- Province: Kohgiluyeh and Boyer-Ahmad
- County: Landeh
- Bakhsh: Central
- Rural District: Tayebi-ye Garmsiri-ye Shomali

Population (2006)
  - Total: 652
- Time zone: UTC+3:30 (IRST)
  - Summer (DST): UTC+4:30 (IRDT)

Malsheykh (Persian: مال شيخ, also Romanized as Mālsheykh) is a village in Tayebi-ye Garmsiri-ye Shomali Rural District, in the Central District of Landeh County, Kohgiluyeh and Boyer-Ahmad Province, Iran. According to the 2006 census, Malsheykh's population was 652, spanning across 117 families.
