= Chah Kardqiam =

Chah Kardqiam چاه كاردقيام
- Village
- Country: Iran
- Province: Kohgiluyeh and Boyer-Ahmad
- County: Landeh
- Bakhsh: Central
- Rural District: Olya Tayeb

Population (2006)
  - Total: 56
- Time zone: UTC+3:30 (IRST)
  - Summer (DST): UTC+4:30 (IRDT)

Chah Kardqiam (Persian: چاه كاردقيام, also Romanized as Chāh Kārdqīām) is a village in Olya Tayeb Rural District, in the Central District of Landeh County, Kohgiluyeh and Boyer-Ahmad Province, Iran. At the 2006 census, its population was 56, in 10 families.
