= Ab Darreh =

Ab Darreh (Persian: اب دره) may refer to:

- Ab Darreh, Khuzestan
- Ab Darreh, Kohgiluyeh and Boyer-Ahmad
- Ab Darreh, Boyer-Ahmad, Kohgiluyeh and Boyer-Ahmad Province
- Ab Darreh, Qazvin
