= Sar Asiab-e Landeh =

Village in Kohgiluyeh and Boyer-Ahmad province, Iran

Sar Asiab-e Landeh Persian: سراسياب لنده
- Village
- Location within Iran
- Coordinates: 30°58′22″N 50°24′36″E
- Country: Iran
- Province: Kohgiluyeh and Boyer-Ahmad
- County: Landeh
- District: Central
- Rural District: Tayebi-ye Garmsiri-ye Shomali

Population (2016)
  - Total: 1,312
- Time zone: UTC+3:30 (IRST)

Sar Asiab-e Landeh (Persian: سراسياب لنده) (Note: Also romanized as Sar Āsīāb-e Landeh; also known as Sar Āsīāb) is a village in Tayebi-ye Garmsiri-ye Shomali Rural District of the Central District of Landeh County, Kohgiluyeh and Boyer-Ahmad Province, Iran.

== Demographics ==
=== Population ===
At the time of the 2006 National Census, the village's population was 1,007 in 187 households, when it was in the former Landeh District of Kohgiluyeh County. The following census in 2011 counted 1,411 people in 314 households. The 2016 census measured the population of the village as 1,312 people in 346 households, by which time the district had been separated from the county in the establishment of Landeh County. The rural district was transferred to the new Central District. It was the most populous village in its rural district.
