= Kun-e Espid =

Kun-e Espid كون اسپيد
- Village
- Location within Iran
- Coordinates: 31°00′58″N 50°15′45″E
- Country: Iran
- Province: Kohgiluyeh and Boyer-Ahmad
- County: Landeh
- Bakhsh: Central
- Rural District: Olya Tayeb

Population (2006)
  - Total: 192
- Time zone: UTC+3:30 (IRST)
  - Summer (DST): UTC+4:30 (IRDT)

Kun-e Espid (Persian: كون اسپيد, also Romanized as Kūn-e Espīd and Koon Espid; also known as Kohneh Sefīd, Kon-e Sefīd, Kūhneh Sefīd, and Kūn Asfīd) is a village in Olya Tayeb Rural District, in the Central District of Landeh County, Kohgiluyeh and Boyer-Ahmad Province, Iran. At the 2006 census, its population was 192, in 34 families.
