= Deliyak, Landeh =

Deliyak دليك
- Village
- Location within Iran
- Coordinates: 31°02′17″N 50°39′22″E
- Country: Iran
- Province: Kohgiluyeh and Boyer-Ahmad
- County: Landeh
- Bakhsh: Central
- Rural District: Olya Tayeb

Population (2006)
  - Total: 28
- Time zone: UTC+3:30 (IRST)
  - Summer (DST): UTC+4:30 (IRDT)

Deliyak (Persian: دليك, also Romanized as Delīyak, Deleyak, and Delīyek) is a village in Olya Tayeb Rural District, in the Central District of Landeh County, Kohgiluyeh and Boyer-Ahmad Province, Iran. At the 2006 census, its population was 28, in 6 families.
