= Ab Razgeh =

Ab Razgeh اب رزگه
- Village
- Location within Iran
- Coordinates: 30°56′48″N 50°27′01″E
- Country: Iran
- Province: Kohgiluyeh and Boyer-Ahmad
- County: Landeh
- Bakhsh: Central
- Rural District: Tayebi-ye Garmsiri-ye Shomali

Population (2006)
  - Total: 261
- Time zone: UTC+3:30 (IRST)
  - Summer (DST): UTC+4:30 (IRDT)

Ab Razgeh (Persian: اب رزگه, also Romanized as Āb Razgeh and Āb-e Razgeh; also known as Āb Zargeh and Āb Zarkeh) is a village in Tayebi-ye Garmsiri-ye Shomali Rural District, in the Central District of Landeh County, Kohgiluyeh and Boyer-Ahmad province, Iran. At the 2006 census, its population was 261, in 46 families.
