= Zu ol Faqari, Kohgiluyeh and Boyer-Ahmad =

Zu ol Faqari ذوالفقاري
- Village
- Location within Iran
- Coordinates: 31°00′03″N 50°20′44″E
- Country: Iran
- Province: Kohgiluyeh and Boyer-Ahmad
- County: Landeh
- Bakhsh: Central
- Rural District: Tayebi-ye Garmsiri-ye Shomali

Population (2006)
  - Total: 30
- Time zone: UTC+3:30 (IRST)
  - Summer (DST): UTC+4:30 (IRDT)

Zu ol Faqari (Persian: ذوالفقاري, also Romanized as Z̄ū ol Faqārī) is a village in Tayebi-ye Garmsiri-ye Shomali Rural District, in the Central District of Landeh County, Kohgiluyeh and Boyer-Ahmad Province, Iran. At the 2006 census, its population was 30, in 8 families.
