= Mal Molla =

Mal Molla مال ملا
- Village
- Location within Iran
- Coordinates: 30°59′57″N 50°23′42″E
- Country: Iran
- Province: Kohgiluyeh and Boyer-Ahmad
- County: Landeh
- Bakhsh: Central
- Rural District: Tayebi-ye Garmsiri-ye Shomali

Population (2016)
  - Total: 513
- Time zone: UTC+3:30 (IRST)
  - Summer (DST): UTC+4:30 (IRDT)

Mal Molla (Persian: مال ملا, also Romanized as Māl Mollā; also known as Mālmūlā-ye Bālā and Māl Mūlā-ye ‘Olyā) is a village in Tayebi-ye Garmsiri-ye Shomali Rural District, in the Central District of Landeh County, Kohgiluyeh and Boyer-Ahmad Province, Iran. At the 2016 census, its population was 513 persons.
