= Sakadeh =

Sakadeh or Sakdeh (Persian: سكده) may refer to:

- Sakadeh, Fars
- Sakdeh, Kohgiluyeh and Boyer-Ahmad
