= Orveh-ye Vosta =

Orveh-ye Vosta عروه وسطي
- Village
- Location within Iran
- Coordinates: 31°03′02″N 50°19′06″E
- Country: Iran
- Province: Kohgiluyeh and Boyer-Ahmad
- County: Landeh
- Bakhsh: Central
- Rural District: Olya Tayeb

Population (2006)
  - Total: 159
- Time zone: UTC+3:30 (IRST)
  - Summer (DST): UTC+4:30 (IRDT)

Orveh-ye Vosta (Persian: عروه وسطي, also Romanized as ‘Orveh-ye Vosţá; also known as ‘Orveh) is a village in Olya Tayeb Rural District, in the Central District of Landeh County, Kohgiluyeh and Boyer-Ahmad Province, Iran. At the 2006 census, its population was 159, in 27 families.
