= Dam Tang-e Landeh =

Dam Tang-e Landeh دم تنگ لنده
- Village
- Country: Iran
- Province: Kohgiluyeh and Boyer-Ahmad
- County: Landeh
- Bakhsh: Central
- Rural District: Tayebi-ye Garmsiri-ye Shomali

Population (2006)
  - Total: 108
- Time zone: UTC+3:30 (IRST)
  - Summer (DST): UTC+4:30 (IRDT)

Dam Tang-e Landeh (Persian: دم تنگ لنده) is a village in Tayebi-ye Garmsiri-ye Shomali Rural District, in the Central District of Landeh County, Kohgiluyeh and Boyer-Ahmad Province, Iran. At the 2006 census, its population was 108, in 23 families.
