= Orveh-ye Olya =

Orveh-ye Olya عروه عليا
- Village
- Location within Iran
- Coordinates: 31°03′12″N 50°18′45″E
- Country: Iran
- Province: Kohgiluyeh and Boyer-Ahmad
- County: Landeh
- Bakhsh: Central
- Rural District: Olya Tayeb

Population (2006)
  - Total: 65
- Time zone: UTC+3:30 (IRST)
  - Summer (DST): UTC+4:30 (IRDT)

Orveh-ye Olya (Persian: عروه عليا, also Romanized as ‘Orveh-ye ‘Olyā) is a village in Olya Tayeb Rural District, in the Central District of Landeh County, Kohgiluyeh and Boyer-Ahmad Province, Iran. At the 2006 census, its population was 65, in 9 families.
