= Darreh Zang, Kohgiluyeh and Boyer-Ahmad =

Darreh Zang دره زنگ
- Village
- Location within Iran
- Coordinates: 30°57′41″N 50°22′34″E
- Country: Iran
- Province: Kohgiluyeh and Boyer-Ahmad
- County: Landeh
- Bakhsh: Central
- Rural District: Tayebi-ye Garmsiri-ye Shomali

Population (2006)
  - Total: 59
- Time zone: UTC+3:30 (IRST)
  - Summer (DST): UTC+4:30 (IRDT)

Darreh Zang (Persian: دره زنگ) is a village in Tayebi-ye Garmsiri-ye Shomali Rural District, in the Central District of Landeh County, Kohgiluyeh and Boyer-Ahmad Province, Iran. At the 2006 census, its population was 59, in 8 families.
