= Dam Tang-e Orveh =

Dam Tang-e Orveh دم تنگ عروه
- Village
- Location within Iran
- Coordinates: 31°01′19″N 50°21′02″E
- Country: Iran
- Province: Kohgiluyeh and Boyer-Ahmad
- County: Landeh
- Bakhsh: Central
- Rural District: Tayebi-ye Garmsiri-ye Shomali

Population (2006)
  - Total: 27
- Time zone: UTC+3:30 (IRST)
  - Summer (DST): UTC+4:30 (IRDT)

Dam Tang-e Orveh (Persian: دم تنگ عروه, also Romanized as Dam Tang-e ‘Orveh and Dam Tang Orveh; also known as Dam Tang) is a village in Tayebi-ye Garmsiri-ye Shomali Rural District, in the Central District of Landeh County, Kohgiluyeh and Boyer-Ahmad Province, Iran. At the 2006 census, its population was 27, in 8 families.
