= Orveh-ye Sofla =

Orveh-ye Sofla عروه سفلي
- Village
- Location within Iran
- Coordinates: 31°03′00″N 50°19′11″E
- Country: Iran
- Province: Kohgiluyeh and Boyer-Ahmad
- County: Landeh
- Bakhsh: Central
- Rural District: Olya Tayeb

Population (2006)
  - Total: 54
- Time zone: UTC+3:30 (IRST)
  - Summer (DST): UTC+4:30 (IRDT)

Orveh-ye Sofla (Persian: عروه سفلي, also Romanized as ‘Orveh-ye Soflá) is a village in Olya Tayeb Rural District, in the Central District of Landeh County, Kohgiluyeh and Boyer-Ahmad Province, Iran. At the 2006 census, its population was 54, in 13 families.
