= Sarkhun =

Sarkhun or Sar Khun or Sorkhun (Persian: سرخون) may refer to:

- Sar Khun, Chaharmahal and Bakhtiari
- Sarkhun, Hormozgan
- Sar Khun, Kohgiluyeh and Boyer-Ahmad
- Sorkhun, Kohgiluyeh and Boyer-Ahmad
- Sarkhun, South Khorasan
- Sarkhun Rural District, in Hormozgan Province
