= Duk, Iran =

Duk (Persian: دوك) may refer to:

- Duk, Isfahan
- Duk, Kohgiluyeh and Boyer-Ahmad
- Duk, Mazandaran
