= Sar Khalun =

Sar Khalun سرخلون
- Village
- Location within Iran
- Coordinates: 31°00′29″N 50°21′40″E
- Country: Iran
- Province: Kohgiluyeh and Boyer-Ahmad
- County: Landeh
- Bakhsh: Central
- Rural District: Tayebi-ye Garmsiri-ye Shomali

Population (2006)
  - Total: 15
- Time zone: UTC+3:30 (IRST)
  - Summer (DST): UTC+4:30 (IRDT)

Sar Khalun (Persian: سرخلون, also Romanized as Sar Khalūn; also known as Deh Sar Khūn and Sar Khūn) is a village in Tayebi-ye Garmsiri-ye Shomali Rural District, in the Central District of Landeh County, Kohgiluyeh and Boyer-Ahmad Province, Iran. At the 2006 census, its population was 15, in 5 families.
