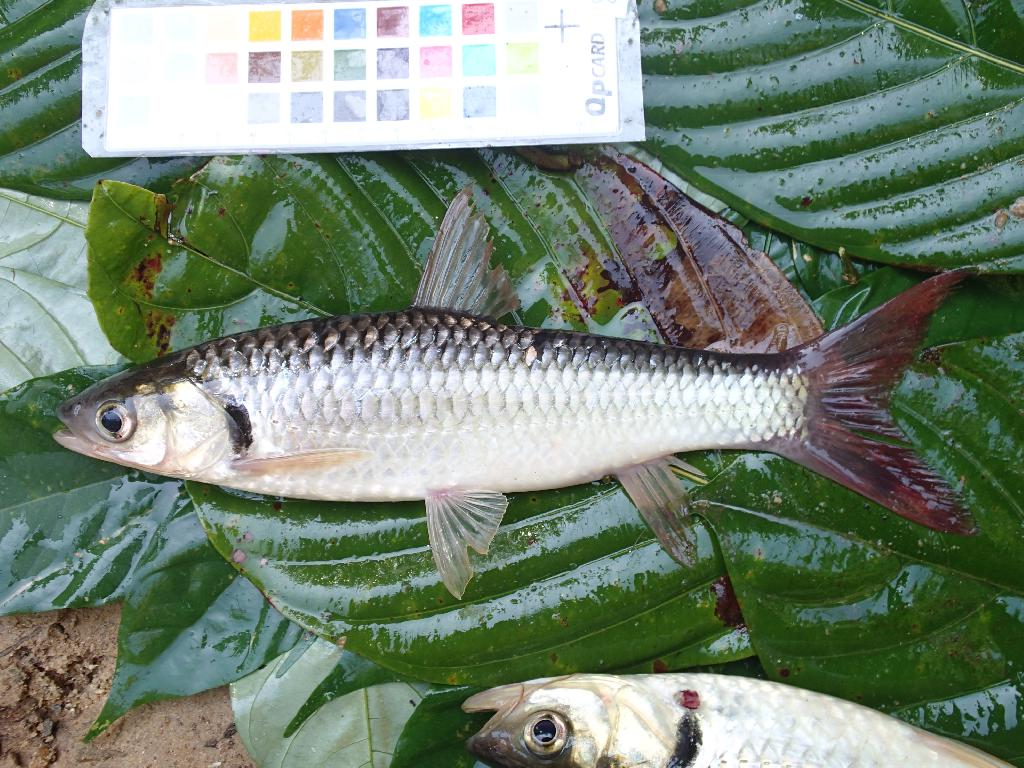

Conservation status
- Data Deficient (IUCN 3.1)

Scientific classification
- Kingdom: Animalia
- Phylum: Chordata
- Class: Actinopterygii
- Order: Cypriniformes
- Suborder: Cyprinoidei
- Family: Leptobarbidae
- Genus: Leptobarbus
- Species: L. hosii

Binomial name
- Leptobarbus hosii (Regan, 1906)
- Distribution of Leptobarbus hosii

Synonyms
- Barbus hosii Regan, 1906

= Leptobarbus hosii =

Species of fish

Leptobarbus hosii, the Sayan Barb, also locally called as Piam and Temopong, is a species of ray-finned fish in the genus Leptobarbus from freshwater habitats in northern Borneo in southeast Asia. However, a previously unknown population has been recorded in West Kalimantan.

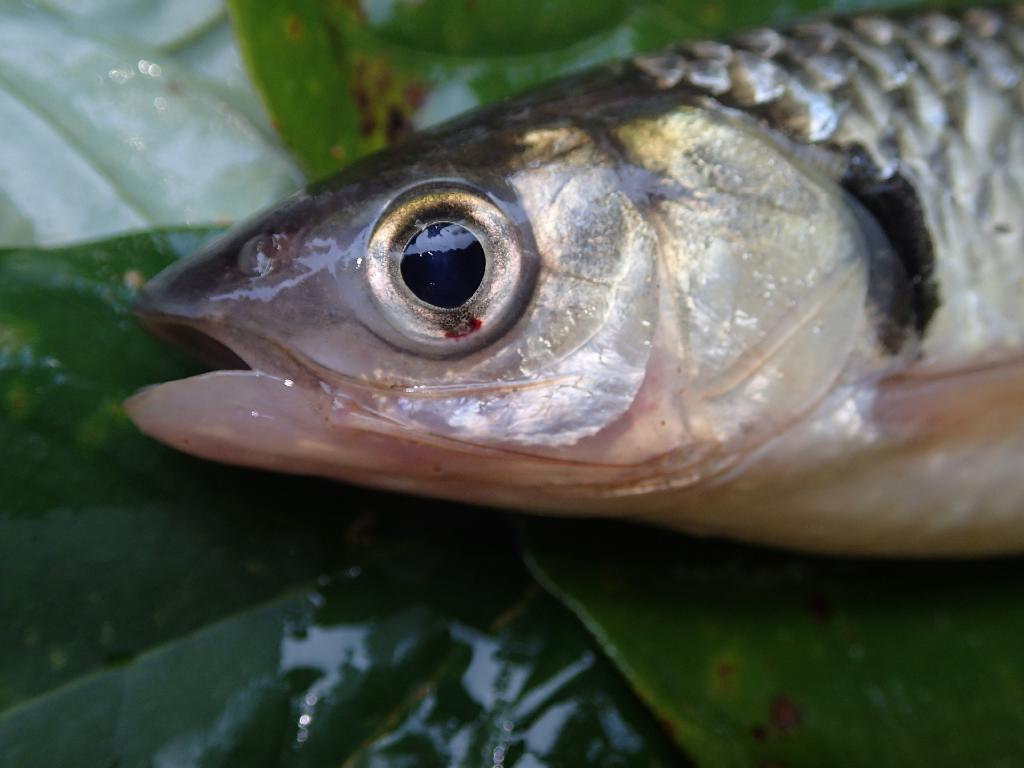
Close up on the eye of L. hosii from Sarawak, Malaysia

Named in honor of Charles Hose (1863–1929), British colonial administrator in Borneo, zoologist and ethnologist, who collected the type specimen.

== Description ==
Little is known of the species except for its appearance. The fins are red to maroon, while near the gill plate and above the pelvic fin there is a black vertical spot. It does not have a black lateral line running along its body, unlike L. melanotaenia and L. rubripinna.

Maxing out at 8.5 cm, it is possibly the smallest member of its genus.
