= Dam Tang-e Chahen =

Dam Tang-e Chahen دم تنگ چاهن
- Village
- Location within Iran
- Coordinates: 30°59′50″N 50°17′54″E
- Country: Iran
- Province: Kohgiluyeh and Boyer-Ahmad
- County: Landeh
- Bakhsh: Central
- Rural District: Olya Tayeb

Population (2006)
  - Total: 47
- Time zone: UTC+3:30 (IRST)
  - Summer (DST): UTC+4:30 (IRDT)

Dam Tang-e Chahen (Persian: دم تنگ چاهن, also Romanized as Dam Tang-e Chāhen; also known as Damtang-e Shāhīn) is a village in Olya Tayeb Rural District, in the Central District of Landeh County, Kohgiluyeh and Boyer-Ahmad Province, Iran. At the 2006 census, its population was 47, in 9 families.
