= Bard Zard, Kohgiluyeh and Boyer-Ahmad =

Bard Zard بردزرد
- Village
- Location within Iran
- Coordinates: 30°57′57″N 50°20′57″E
- Country: Iran
- Province: Kohgiluyeh and Boyer-Ahmad
- County: Landeh
- Bakhsh: Central
- Rural District: Olya Tayeb

Population (2006)
  - Total: 28
- Time zone: UTC+3:30 (IRST)
  - Summer (DST): UTC+4:30 (IRDT)

Bard Zard (Persian: بردزرد, also Romanized as Badr-e Zard) is a village in Olya Tayeb Rural District, in the Central District of Landeh County, Kohgiluyeh and Boyer-Ahmad Province, Iran. At the 2006 census, its population was 28, in 4 families.
