= Jan Khani =

Village in Kohgiluyeh and Boyer-Ahmad province, Iran

Jan Khani Persian: جان خاني
- Village
- Location within Iran
- Coordinates: 30°55′36″N 50°16′25″E
- Country: Iran
- Province: Kohgiluyeh and Boyer-Ahmad
- County: Landeh
- District: Central
- Rural District: Olya Tayeb

Population (2016)
  - Total: 898
- Time zone: UTC+3:30 (IRST)

Jan Khani (Persian: جان خاني) (Note: Also romanized as Jān Khānī; also known as Jahān Khānī, Qeyām, and Qīām) is a village in Olya Tayeb Rural District of the Central District of Landeh County, Kohgiluyeh and Boyer-Ahmad province, Iran.

== Demographics ==
=== Population ===
At the time of the 2006 National Census, the village's population was 862 in 164 households, when it was in the former Landeh District of Kohgiluyeh County. The following census in 2011 counted 839 people in 201 households. The 2016 census measured the population of the village as 898 people in 252 households, by which time the district had been separated from the county in the establishment of Landeh County. The rural district was transferred to the new Central District. It was the most populous village in its rural district.
