= Ruch-e Sofla, Kohgiluyeh and Boyer-Ahmad =

Ruch-e Sofla روچ سفلي
- Village
- Location within Iran
- Coordinates: 30°56′22″N 50°19′41″E
- Country: Iran
- Province: Kohgiluyeh and Boyer-Ahmad
- County: Landeh
- Bakhsh: Central
- Rural District: Olya Tayeb

Population (2006)
  - Total: 30
- Time zone: UTC+3:30 (IRST)
  - Summer (DST): UTC+4:30 (IRDT)

Ruch-e Sofla (Persian: روچ سفلي, also Romanized as Rūch-e Soflá; also known as Roch, Roch Bālā, Zoj-e Bālā, and Zoj-e ‘Olyā) is a village in Olya Tayeb Rural District, in the Central District of Landeh County, Kohgiluyeh and Boyer-Ahmad Province, Iran. At the 2006 census, its population was 30, in 5 families.
