= Chahar Rah-e Ali Tayyeb =

Village in Kohgiluyeh and Boyer-Ahmad province, Iran

Chahar Rah-e Ali Tayyeb Persian: چهارراه عالي طيب
- Village
- Location within Iran
- Coordinates: 30°58′11″N 50°17′52″E
- Country: Iran
- Province: Kohgiluyeh and Boyer-Ahmad
- County: Landeh
- District: Central
- Rural District: Olya Tayeb

Population (2016)
  - Total: 292
- Time zone: UTC+3:30 (IRST)

Chahar Rah-e Ali Tayyeb (Persian: چهارراه عالي طيب) (Note: Also romanized as Chahār Rāh-e ʿAlī Ţayyeb; also known as Chahār Rāh-e Āl-e Ţayyeb) is a village in, and the capital of, Olya Tayeb Rural District of the Central District of Landeh County, Kohgiluyeh and Boyer-Ahmad province, Iran.

== Demographics ==
=== Population ===
At the time of the 2006 National Census, the village's population was 260 in 56 households, when it was in the former Landeh District of Kohgiluyeh County. The following census in 2011 counted 288 people in 73 households. The 2016 census measured the population of the village as 292 people in 91 households, by which time the district had been separated from the county in the establishment of Landeh County. The rural district was transferred to the new Central District.
