= Dook =

Dook may refer to:

== People ==
- Bill Dooks, Canadian politician
- Sam Dook, a member of The Go! Team

== Other ==
- Dook LaRue, an animatronic drummer in The Rock-afire Explosion
- The "dooking" noise a ferret makes

== See also ==
- Duk (disambiguation)
- DUK (disambiguation)
- Duck (disambiguation)
- Dookie
- Dooks, an aircraft manufacturer in Russia
