= Ruch-e Sofla =

Ruch-e Sofla (Persian: روچ سفلي) may refer to:

- Ruch-e Sofla, Kohgiluyeh and Boyer-Ahmad
- Ruch-e Sofla, Qazvin
