= Larub =

Larub (Persian: لاروب) may refer to:

- Larub, Kohgiluyeh
- Larub, Landeh
