= Qiam =

Qiam, also spelled qiyam, qiyaamm, giome, is an Arabic word (قيم) that is also used in Arabic-based languages.

- Qiam 1 is a missile manufactured in Iran.
- Qiam is a village in Iran.
