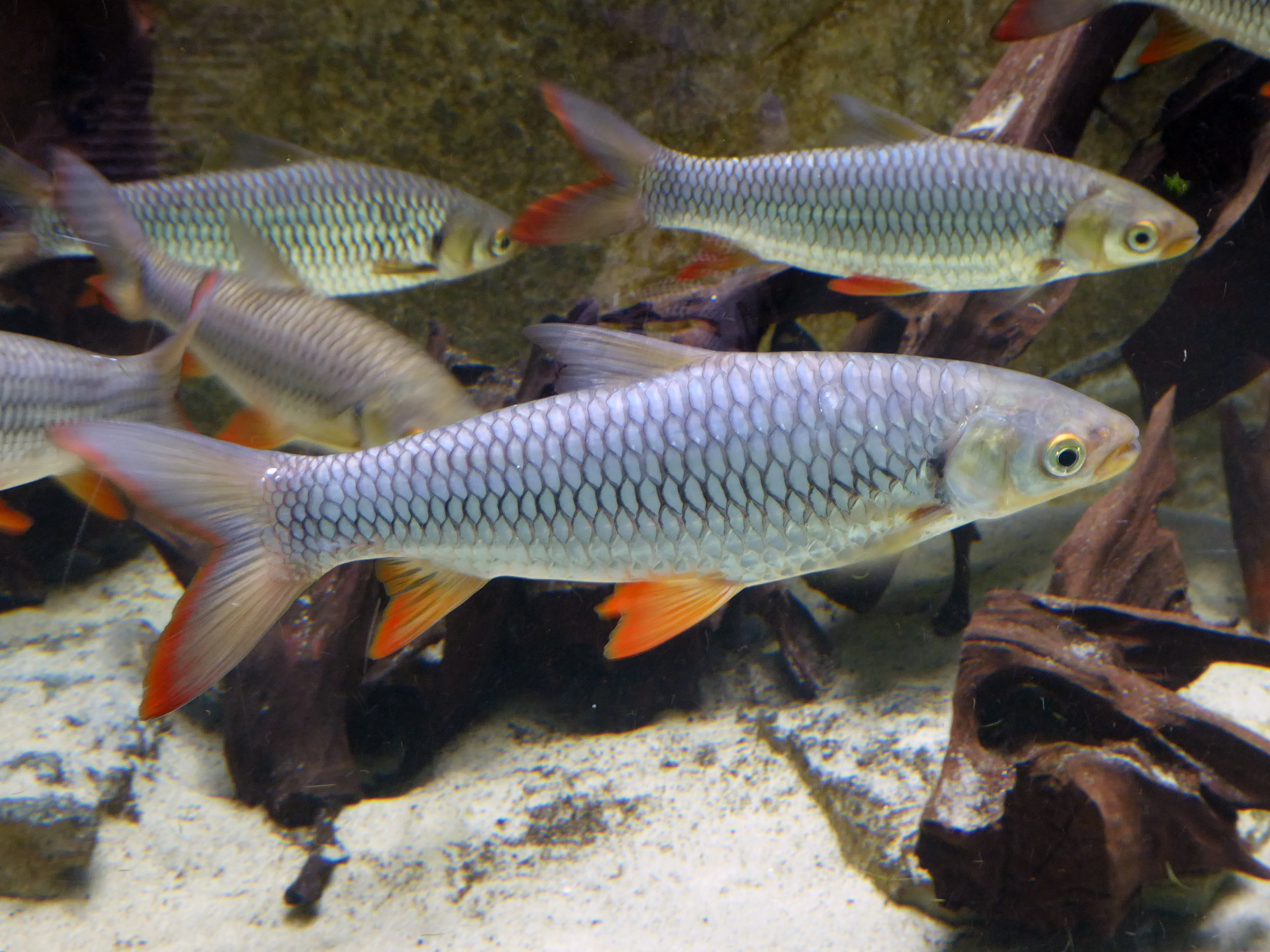
- Leptobarbus rubripinna

Scientific classification
- Kingdom: Animalia
- Phylum: Chordata
- Class: Actinopterygii
- Order: Cypriniformes
- Family: Leptobarbidae; Bleeker, 1864
- Genus: Leptobarbus; Bleeker, 1860

Type species
- Barbus hoevenii Bleeker, 1851

Species
- 5, see text.

Synonyms
- Filirasbora Fowler, 1937

= Leptobarbus =

Genus of fishes

Leptobarbus, the cigar barbs, is a genus of cyprinoid ray-finned fishes, it is the only genus in the monotypic family Leptobarbidae. The fishes in this genus are native to freshwater habitats in Southeast Asia. They are important food fish. It is the only genus in the subfamily Leptobarbinae. Leptobarbus hoevenii or "sultan fish" migrate the fresh water rivers of Malaysia and travel at the surface in schools of 40–80 individuals at speeds of 0.48-1.08 km. Acid-soluble collagen (ASC) and pepsin-soluble collagen (PSC) were extracted from the muscles of selected cultured catfish (hybrid of Clarias gariepinus x Clarias macrocephalus), red tilapia (Oreochromis niloticus), black tilapia (Oreochromis mossambicus), pangasius catfish (Pangasianodon hypophthalmus), sultan fish (Leptobarbus hoevenii) and labyrinth fish (Trichogaster trichopterus), freshwater fishes that are widely consumed in Malaysia. The extracted yields for the tested species were higher for PSC as compared with ASC.

== Species ==
Leptobarbus contains the following species:

- Leptobarbus hoevenii (Bleeker, 1851) (Hoven's carp, Mad barb, Sultan fish)
- Leptobarbus hosii (Regan, 1906)
- Leptobarbus melanopterus M. C. W. Weber & de Beaufort, 1916
- Leptobarbus melanotaenia Boulenger, 1894
- Leptobarbus rubripinna (Fowler, 1937)
