= Sar Sureh =

Sar Sureh (Persian: سرسوره) may refer to:

- Sar Sureh, Kohgiluyeh and Boyer-Ahmad
- Sar Sureh, Sistan and Baluchestan
