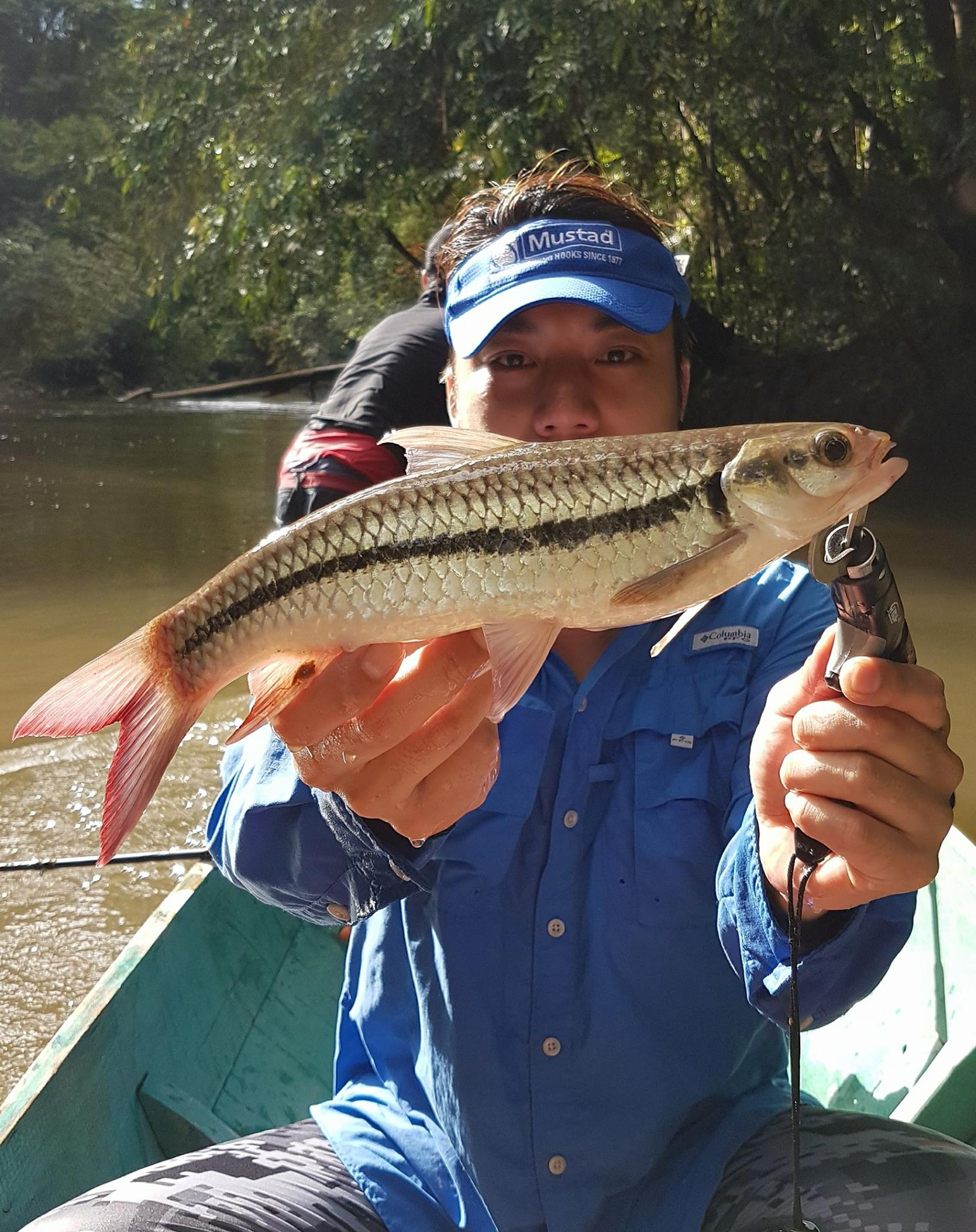

Conservation status
- Least Concern (IUCN 3.1)

Scientific classification
- Kingdom: Animalia
- Phylum: Chordata
- Class: Actinopterygii
- Order: Cypriniformes
- Suborder: Cyprinoidei
- Family: Leptobarbidae
- Genus: Leptobarbus
- Species: L. melanotaenia

Binomial name
- Leptobarbus melanotaenia Boulenger, 1894

= Leptobarbus melanotaenia =

Species of fish

Leptobarbus melanotaenia, or the Bornean Sultan Fish, is a species of ray-finned fish in the genus Leptobarbus. It occurs in freshwater basins in Borneo. This species is a preferred food fish to be caught by local communities.

== Local names ==
- Called Hanyan by the Merap community
- Called Sayen by the Kenyah community
- Called Anyen by the Punan community

== Description ==
The standard body length is 34 cm (13 in), but sexual maturity can be reached at 29 cm (11 in). The distinguishing feature of the species is the occurrence of a black mid-lateral line running along the lateral line, similar to L. rubripinna. However, unlike L. rubripinna, this black line does not fade or disappear as the fish reaches maturity.

== Ecology ==
They feed primarily on aquatic plants, leaf litter, fallen fruit, and seeds.
