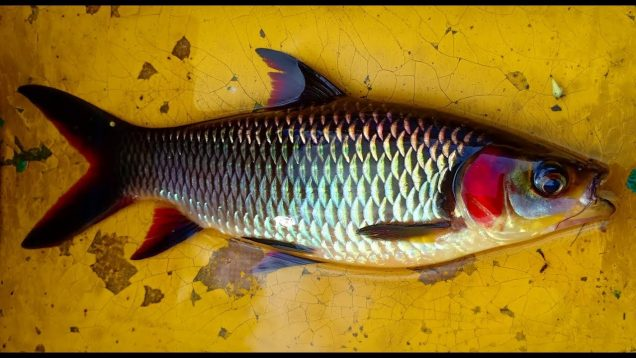

Conservation status
- Near Threatened (IUCN 3.1)

Scientific classification
- Kingdom: Animalia
- Phylum: Chordata
- Class: Actinopterygii
- Order: Cypriniformes
- Family: Leptobarbidae
- Genus: Leptobarbus
- Species: L. melanopterus

Binomial name
- Leptobarbus melanopterus M. C. W. Weber & de Beaufort, 1916

= Leptobarbus melanopterus =

Species of fish

Leptobarbus melanopterus is a species of freshwater ray-finned fish belonging to the family Leptobarbidae, the cigar barbs. This fish is known only from the Kapuas River basin in Western Borneo. Locally it is called Jelawat pipi merah, when translated means Red Cheeked Sultan Fish, they are also called blood carp by aquarium hobbyists due to their vibrant red cheeks.

It is a high economic value fish for both commercial and collection purposes. However, the species has never been successfully cultured and fishermen still rely on the wild population.

== Description ==
Can grow up to a length of 24.2 cm. Its most distinguishing feature is the bright red blotch on its gill plate, with a black vertical blotch behind the gill plate. Depending on the habitat their scales could appear silver to black, but most commonly a blackish silver body. All fins being a dark red color, with a deeply forked red caudal fin with a red margin and a black sub-marginal stripe along each lobe, although some have been caught with caudal fins fully black.

== Ecology ==
Occurs in rivers and streams of swamp forests, usually in backwaters. Feeds primarily on plants, insects, and crustaceans.
