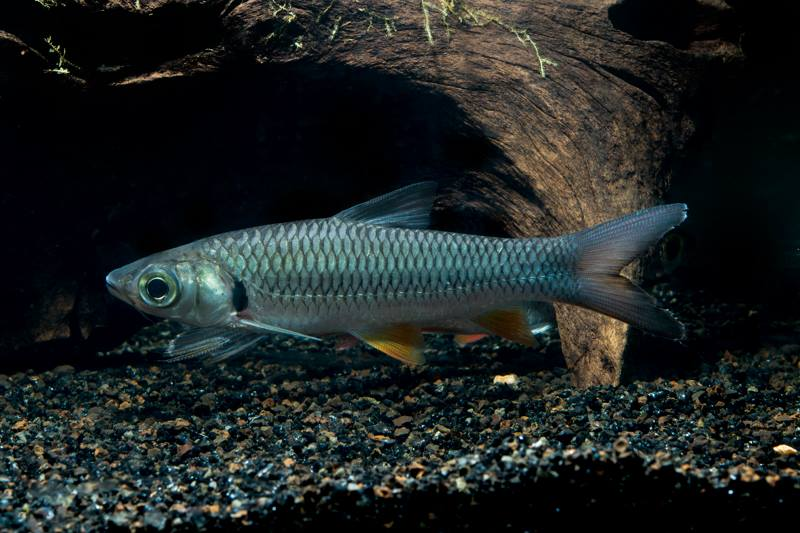
- A juvenile L. hoevenii lacks the midlateral black line of L. rubripinna (often confused with the very similar L. hoevenii)

Conservation status
- Least Concern (IUCN 3.1)

Scientific classification
- Kingdom: Animalia
- Phylum: Chordata
- Class: Actinopterygii
- Order: Cypriniformes
- Suborder: Cyprinoidei
- Family: Leptobarbidae
- Genus: Leptobarbus
- Species: L. hoevenii

Binomial name
- Leptobarbus hoevenii (Bleeker, 1851)

Synonyms
- Barbus hoevenii Bleeker, 1851; Puntius aphya Günther, 1868; Gnathopogon javanicus Bleeker, 1864

= Leptobarbus hoevenii =

Hoven's carp

Species of fish

Leptobarbus hoevenii, Hoven's carp, mad barb or sultan fish, is a species of freshwater ray-finned fish belonging to the family Leptobarbidae, the cigar barbs.

Named in honor of Bleeker's fellow Dutchman, "le célèbre professeur de zoologie" Jan van der Hoeven (1801–1868).

== Ecology ==
It is native to freshwater habitats in the Thai-Malay Peninsula, Borneo and Sumatra. In Peninsular Malaysia, this species is only found the states of Perak and Pahang. However, a single specimen was caught in the Bernam River, Selangor. Populations further north in the Chao Phraya and Mekong Basins were included in this species until 2009, but are now considered a separate species, L. rubripinna. The two are frequently confused and the same common names have been used for both; only L. rubripinna is known from the aquarium trade.

It may reach up to about 1 m (3 ft) long. A midwater to near bottom dweller. frequently lives in groups. Stomach contents shows signs of an omnivorous diet, mainly shrimp, insect larvae and green matter.

== Economic Importance ==
In Malaysia, it is a highly prized food fish, being one of the most expensive fish in the country, wild specimens can be sold for thousands of ringgit. Due to this they are overfished and are now rare in the wild, further increasing their value and local fishermen's incentive to catch it. Their soft meat and scales are considered a delicacy.

== Cultural History ==
In Malaysia, the reason for its other common local name, translated to "The Sultan Fish" is attributed to the claim that the fish was a favorite among royal members and that palace workers would go to markets and call for any fishermen that had the Sultan's fish. By word of mouth, the fish was then referred as the Sultan's fish.

Another version is that a particular Sultan loved eating the fish so much that he decreed that peasants were not allowed to eat the fish if they were to catch it, and that the fish was to be brought to the palace for the Sultan.

In Thailand, it is called "Pla Ba" (Thai: ปลาบ้า; pronounced [plāː baː]; "rabid fish") because when eaten, the person who eats it will become intoxicated or may even die. This is because the fish store toxins in their bodies from poisonous fruits, such as thornapples (Datura metel) or Hydnocarpus anthelminticus, that they eat.
