= Landeh =

City in Kohgiluyeh and Boyer-Ahmad province, Iran

Landeh Persian: لنده
- City
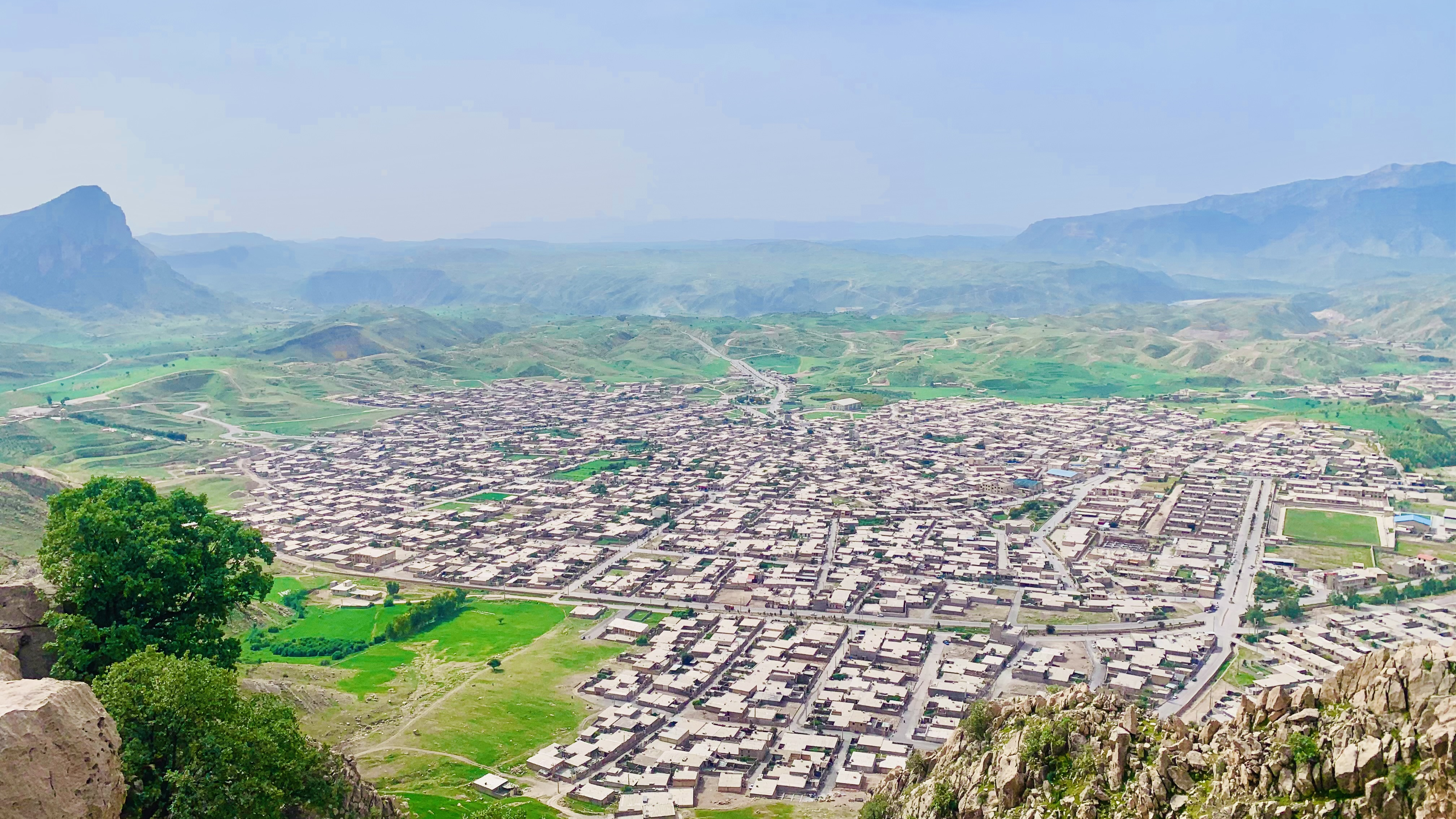
- Landeh in spring with Dasvapas mountain to the left

- Location within Iran
- Coordinates: 30°58′51″N 50°25′17″E
- Country: Iran
- Province: Kohgiluyeh and Boyer-Ahmad
- County: Landeh
- District: Central

Population (2016)
  - Total: 12,772
- Time zone: UTC+3:30 (IRST)

Landeh (Persian: لنده) (Note: Also romanized as Lendeh; also known as Lindeh and Lindsh) is a city in the Central District of Landeh County, Kohgiluyeh and Boyer-Ahmad province, Iran, serving as capital of both the county and the district. It is also the administrative center for Tayebi-ye Garmsiri-ye Shomali Rural District.

== Demographics ==
=== Population ===
At the time of the 2006 National Census, the city's population was 10,540 in 1,991 households, when it was in the former Landeh District of Kohgiluyeh County. The following census in 2011 counted 11,670 people in 2,483 households. The 2016 census measured the population of the city as 12,772 people in 3,206 households, by which time the district had been separated from the county in the establishment of Landeh County. Landeh was transferred to the new Central District as the county's capital.
