= Chahar Rah, Kohgiluyeh and Boyer-Ahmad =

Chahar Rah چهارراه
- Village
- Location within Iran
- Coordinates: 30°58′15″N 50°19′20″E
- Country: Iran
- Province: Kohgiluyeh and Boyer-Ahmad
- County: Kohgiluyeh
- Bakhsh: Charusa
- Rural District: Tayebi-ye Sarhadi-ye Gharbi

Population (2006)
  - Total: 219
- Time zone: UTC+3:30 (IRST)
  - Summer (DST): UTC+4:30 (IRDT)

Chahar Rah (Persian: چهارراه, also Romanized as Chahār Rāh and Chehār Rāh) is a village in Tayebi-ye Sarhadi-ye Gharbi Rural District, Charusa District, Kohgiluyeh County, Kohgiluyeh and Boyer-Ahmad Province, Iran. At the 2006 census, its population was 219, in 38 families.
