= Chahar Rah Beheshti Sapu =

Chahar Rah Beheshti Sapu چهارراه بهشتي سپو
- Village
- Country: Iran
- Province: Kohgiluyeh and Boyer-Ahmad
- County: Kohgiluyeh
- Bakhsh: Central
- Rural District: Dehdasht-e Sharqi

Population (2006)
  - Total: 171
- Time zone: UTC+3:30 (IRST)
  - Summer (DST): UTC+4:30 (IRDT)

Chahar Rah Beheshti Sapu (Persian: چهارراه بهشتي سپو, also Romanized as Chahār Rāh Bheshtī Sapū) is a village in Dehdasht-e Sharqi Rural District, in the Central District of Kohgiluyeh County, Kohgiluyeh and Boyer-Ahmad Province, Iran. At the 2006 census, its population was 171, in 29 families.
