= Dam-e Tang-e Bavary =

Dam-e Tang-e Bavary دم تنگ باورئ
- Village
- Location within Iran
- Coordinates: 30°45′20″N 51°19′14″E
- Country: Iran
- Province: Kohgiluyeh and Boyer-Ahmad
- County: Dana
- Bakhsh: Kabgian
- Rural District: Kabgian

Population (2006)
  - Total: 41
- Time zone: UTC+3:30 (IRST)
  - Summer (DST): UTC+4:30 (IRDT)

Dam-e Tang-e Bavary (Persian: دم تنگ باورئ, also Romanized as Dam-e Tang-e Bāvary; also known as Dam-e Tang) is a village in Kabgian Rural District, Kabgian District, Dana County, Kohgiluyeh and Boyer-Ahmad Province, Iran. At the 2006 census, its population was 41, in 7 families.
