= Dam Tang-e Masri =

Dam Tang-e Masri دمتنگمصري
- Village
- Country: Iran
- Province: Hormozgan
- County: Bandar Abbas
- Bakhsh: Fin
- Rural District: Fin

Population (2006)
  - Total: 29
- Time zone: UTC+3:30 (IRST)
  - Summer (DST): UTC+4:30 (IRDT)

Dam Tang-e Masri (Persian: دمتنگمصري, also Romanized as Dam Tang-e Maṣrī) is a village in Fin Rural District, Fin District, Bandar Abbas County, Hormozgan Province, Iran. At the 2006 census, its population was 29, in 10 families.
