= Darreh Zang, Dehdez =

Darreh Zang دره زنگ
- Village
- Location within Iran
- Coordinates: 31°35′40″N 50°19′12″E
- Country: Iran
- Province: Khuzestan
- County: Izeh
- Bakhsh: Dehdez
- Rural District: Donbaleh Rud-e Jonubi

Population (2006)
  - Total: 462
- Time zone: UTC+3:30 (IRST)
  - Summer (DST): UTC+4:30 (IRDT)

Darreh Zang (Persian: دره زنگ, also Romanized as Darreh-ye Zang) is a village in Donbaleh Rud-e Jonubi Rural District, Dehdez District, Izeh County, Khuzestan Province, Iran. At the 2006 census, its population was 462, in 69 families.
