= Chahar Rah-e Zirrah =

Chahar Rah-e Zirrah چهارراه زيرراه
- Village
- Location within Iran
- Coordinates: 30°05′09″N 51°09′02″E
- Country: Iran
- Province: Fars
- County: Mamasani
- Bakhsh: Mahvarmilani
- Rural District: Mahur

Population (2006)
  - Total: 33
- Time zone: UTC+3:30 (IRST)
  - Summer (DST): UTC+4:30 (IRDT)

Chahar Rah-e Zirrah (Persian: چهارراه زيرراه, also Romanized as Chahār Rāh-e Zīrrāh; also known as Chahār Rāh) is a village in Mahur Rural District, Mahvarmilani District, Mamasani County, Fars province, Iran. At the 2006 census, its population was 33, in 9 families.
