= Ab Darreh, Khuzestan =

Ab Darreh اب دره
- Village
- Location within Iran
- Coordinates: 32°19′00″N 49°27′00″E
- Country: Iran
- Province: Khuzestan
- County: Andika
- Bakhsh: Central
- Rural District: Qaleh-ye Khvajeh

Population (2006)
  - Total: 257
- Time zone: UTC+3:30 (IRST)
  - Summer (DST): UTC+4:30 (IRDT)

Ab Darreh (Persian: اب دره, also Romanized as Āb Darreh; also known as Āb Darreh-ye Abūl Qāsem and Āb Darreh-ye Abū ol Qāsem) is a village in Qaleh-ye Khvajeh Rural District, in the Central District of Andika County, Khuzestan Province, Iran. At the 2006 census, its population was 257, in 32 families.
