= Dam Tang-e Miyan Tangan =

Dam Tang-e Miyan Tangan دم تنگ ميان تنگان
- Village
- Location within Iran
- Coordinates: 30°28′36″N 51°04′34″E
- Country: Iran
- Province: Kohgiluyeh and Boyer-Ahmad
- County: Basht
- Bakhsh: Central
- Rural District: Kuh Mareh Khami

Population (2006)
  - Total: 103
- Time zone: UTC+3:30 (IRST)
  - Summer (DST): UTC+4:30 (IRDT)

Dam Tang-e Miyan Tangan (Persian: دم تنگ ميان تنگان, also Romanized as Dam Tang-e Mīyān Tangān; also known as Damtang-e Mīyānmakān) is a village in Kuh Mareh Khami Rural District, in the Central District of Basht County, Kohgiluyeh and Boyer-Ahmad Province, Iran. At the 2006 census, its population was 103, in 22 families.
