= Dam Tang-e Darrehna =

Dam Tang-e Darrehna دم تنگ دره نا
- Village
- Location within Iran
- Coordinates: 31°07′48″N 50°03′32″E
- Country: Iran
- Province: Kohgiluyeh and Boyer-Ahmad
- County: Bahmai
- Bakhsh: Bahmai-ye Garmsiri
- Rural District: Bahmai-ye Garmsiri-ye Shomali

Population (2006)
  - Total: 62
- Time zone: UTC+3:30 (IRST)
  - Summer (DST): UTC+4:30 (IRDT)

Dam Tang-e Darrehna (Persian: دم تنگ دره نا, also Romanized as Dam Tang-e Darrehnā; also known as Damtang-e Darrehnā) is a village in Bahmai-ye Garmsiri-ye Shomali Rural District, Bahmai-ye Garmsiri District, Bahmai County, Kohgiluyeh and Boyer-Ahmad Province, Iran. At the 2006 census, its population was 62, in seven families.
