= Bard Zard, Bagh-e Malek =

Bard Zard بردزرد
- Village
- Location within Iran
- Coordinates: 31°13′51″N 49°58′26″E
- Country: Iran
- Province: Khuzestan
- County: Bagh-e Malek
- Bakhsh: Meydavud
- Rural District: Saroleh

Population (2006)
  - Total: 21
- Time zone: UTC+3:30 (IRST)
  - Summer (DST): UTC+4:30 (IRDT)

Bard Zard (Persian: بردزرد, also Romanized as Bardezard) is a village in Saroleh Rural District, Meydavud District, Bagh-e Malek County, Khuzestan Province, Iran. At the 2006 census, its population was 21, in 4 families.
