= DUK =

DUK may refer to:

- Diabetes UK
- Digital University Kerala, the Kerala University of Digital Sciences, Innovation and Technology, India
- DUK (film distributor), a film distributor
- Duke Energy (NYSE:DUK)

== See also ==
- DUK PS (Dobrovolʹchyi ukrainsʹkyi korpus "Právyi séktor"), the Ukrainian Volunteer Corps
- Duk (disambiguation)
