= Pla duk =

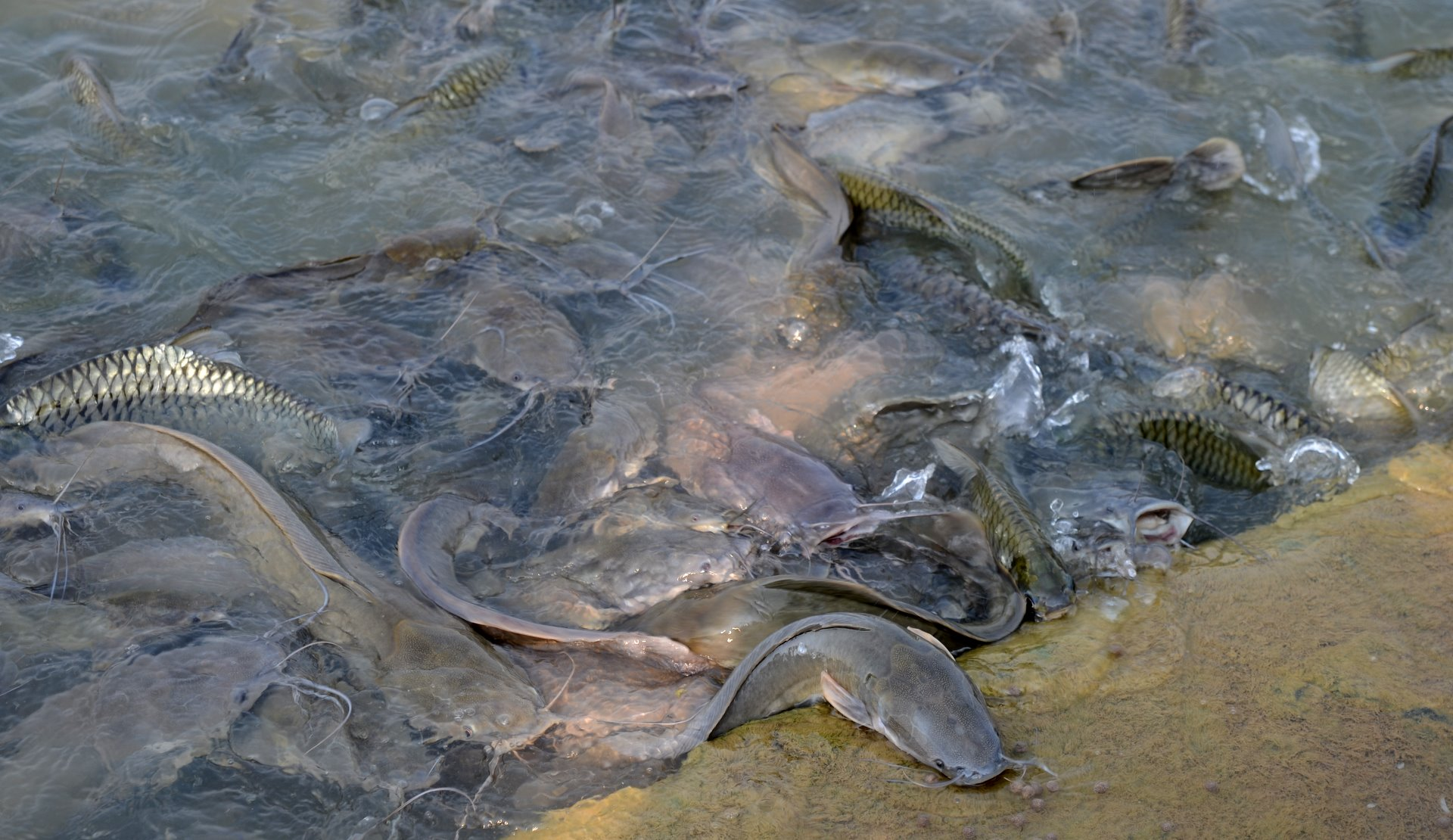
Pla duk crawling out of a lake in Laplae District, Uttaradit Province, Thailand

Pla duk may refer to:

- A generic name for fishes of the genus Clarias, especially in Thailand
  - The broadhead catfish, Clarias macrocephalus
  - The walking catfish, Clarias batrachus
  - Hybrid aquacultured Clarias
