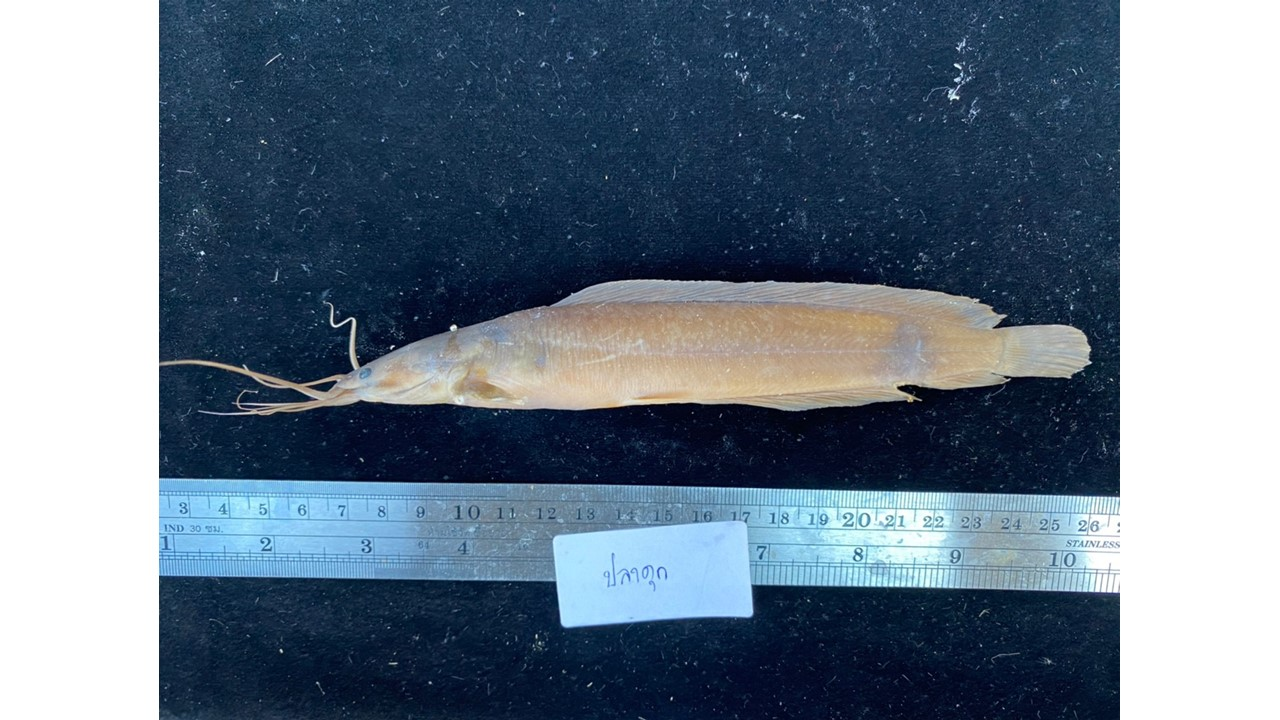
- Preserved specimen, possibly from Thailand.

Conservation status
- Data Deficient (IUCN 3.1)

Scientific classification
- Kingdom: Animalia
- Phylum: Chordata
- Class: Actinopterygii
- Order: Siluriformes
- Family: Clariidae
- Genus: Clarias
- Species: C. macrocephalus

Binomial name
- Clarias macrocephalus Günther, 1864

= Broadhead catfish =

Species of fish

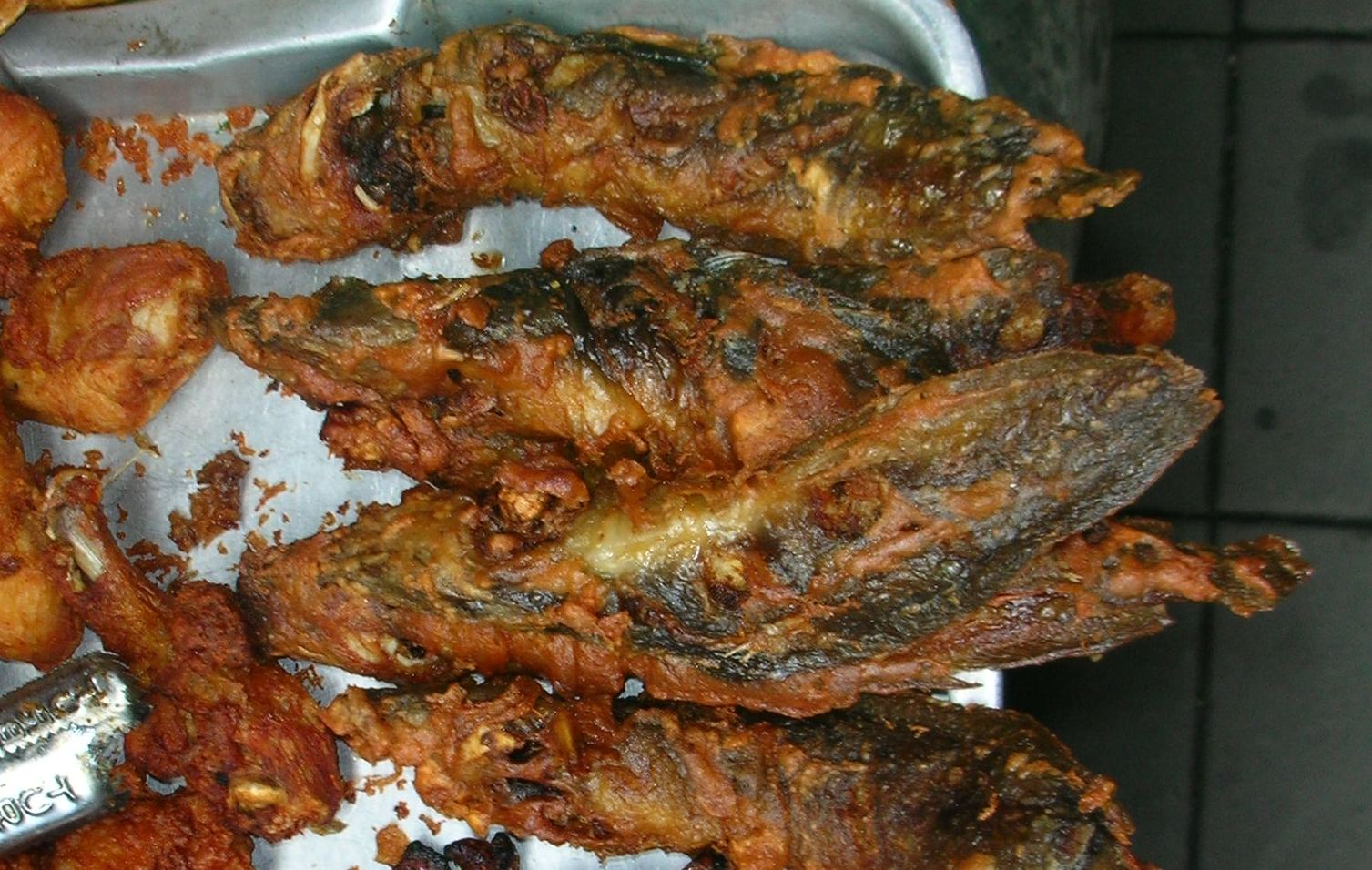
Fried Pla duk (ปลาดุก) in Bangkok

The broadhead catfish (Clarias macrocephalus) is an economically important air-breathing catfish that is a native of Southeast Asia. The fish is farmed in ponds for use in human consumption in countries such as Thailand (Thai: ปลาดุกอุย) and the Philippines. However, native populations now face extinction due to man-made activities and genetic introgression due to interbreeding with escaped aquaculture hybrids.

In Thailand both this fish and the walking catfish (Clarias batrachus) are known as Pla Duk (Thai: ปลาดุก). They are common inexpensive food items, prepared in a variety of ways, being often offered by street vendors, especially barbecued or fried.

== Description ==
The broadhead catfish is identified by its large dorsal fin and its short and rounded occipital process. The occipital process is pointed in Clarias batrachus, a closely related species. Another identifying feature for the broadhead catfish is the white spots on the side of its black body. The male and the female catfish can be identified by looking at their anus. The males have elongated urogenital papillae around their anus while the females only have a round opening. The males can reach lengths of up to 120 cm (47 in) TL.

== Habitat and distribution ==
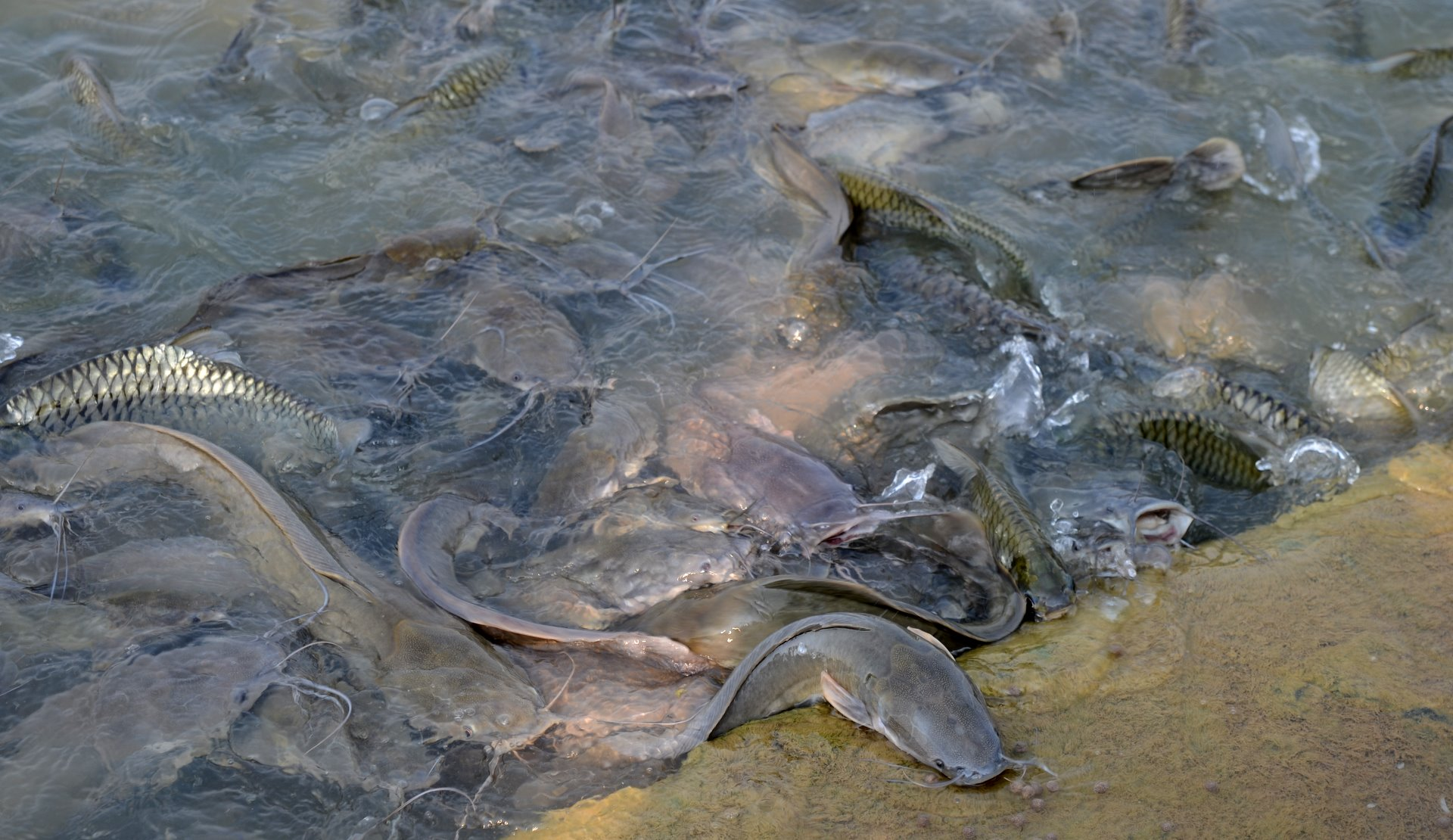
C. macrocephalus and Java barb in a public lake in Laplae district, Uttaradit Province, Thailand

The broadhead catfish prefers the Benthopelagic zone and can survive in both brackish and fresh water. The fish stays in tropical climates ranging in the 34°N - 4°N latitudes. As such, the fish is found in tropical Asian countries such as Thailand, Vietnam, China, Malaysia, Guam, and the Philippines. Clarias macrocephalus prefers living in marshes, canals, rice fields, stagnant pools and rivers. Should the water evaporate during the dry seasons, the fish is able to lie buried for a long time. Should there be a need to relocate, the fish can move out of the water using its extended fins.

The fish, together with other members of the genus Clarias are threatened by man-made activities such as urbanization, habitat fragmentation, and exploitation by the expanding aquaculture business. The catfish population is also threatened by escaped hybrids born from female C. macrocephalus and male introduced C. gariepinus. The hybrid is able to breed with both species and could cause a genetic introgression which could result in species extinction. The hybrid also grows faster than the native fish and might outcompete the native stock for resources.

== Ecology and life history ==
As a carnivore, it feeds on aquatic insects, young shrimp and smaller fishes. However, it can also eat rice bran, kitchen refuse, fish meal, or formulated feeds. In turn, the fish is attacked by Achlya, Aphanomyces, and Pythium. In the wild, the fish spawns in small streams. The fish does not, however, spawn on its own in captivity. Spawning must be induced by injecting mature females with hormones. The eggs from the female are removed while milt, obtained from the reproductive tract of sacrificed males, are introduced. The resulting catfish larvae can be fed with newly hatched brine shrimp and water fleas four to five days after hatching. After more than one month, the fingerlings can be transferred to grow-out ponds.

== Importance to humans ==
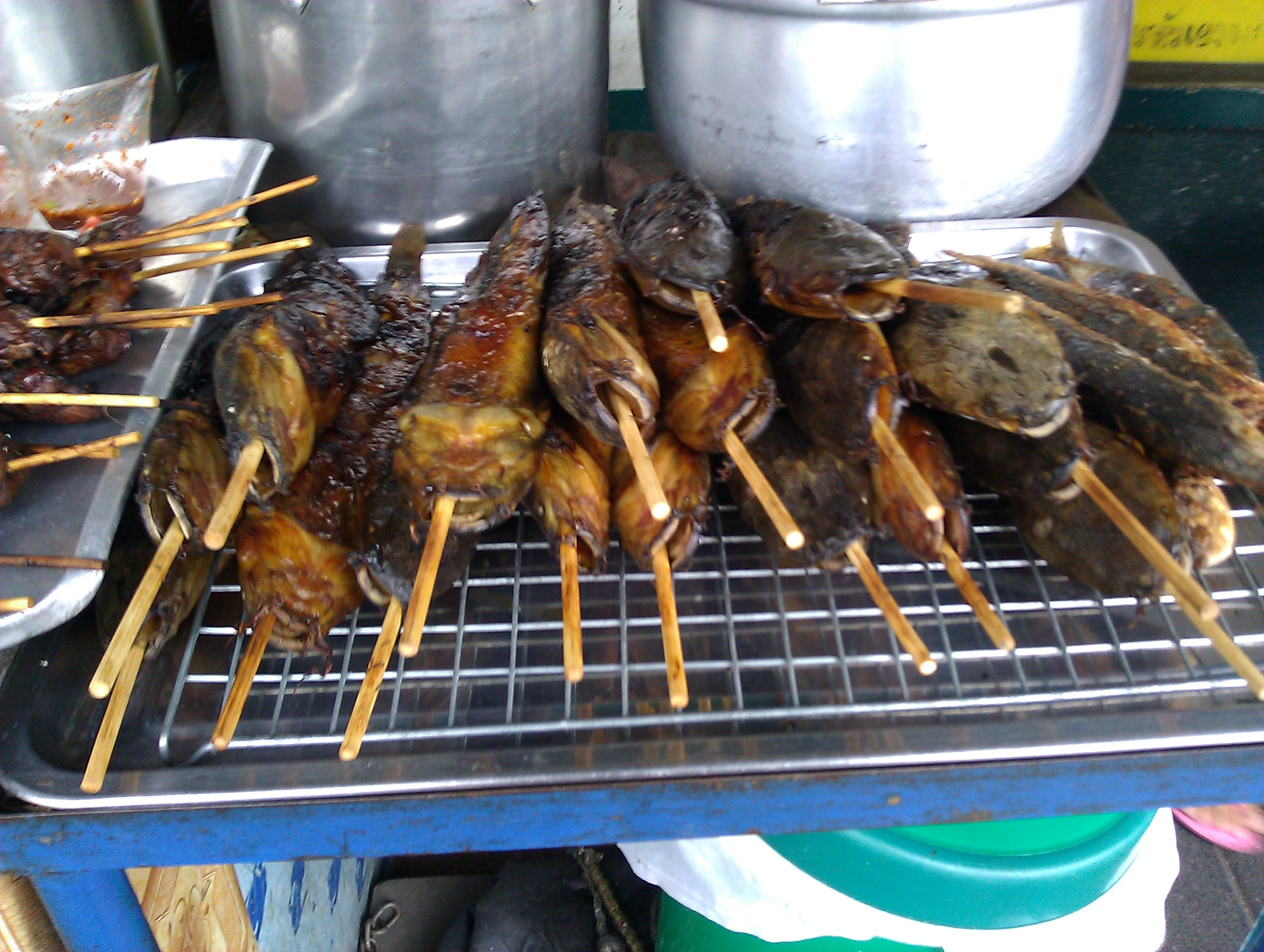
Catfish street food in Chonburi, Thailand

The catfish is sold commercially as live or frozen. It is prepared by either frying, broiling or baking it. The fish is can also be packaged in cans though its black skin should be removed as it looks unattractive. The fish is cultivated but only in small scale fish ponds as it has shown a slow growth rate and a small amount of fry even though it is more preferred due to its appearance and eating quality. In Thailand, the fish is considered better and more nourishing than the walking catfish.
