= Dam-e Tang-e Shahid Deli Bajak =

Dam-e Tang-e Shahid Deli Bajak دم تنگ شهيددلي بجك
- Village
- Country: Iran
- Province: Kohgiluyeh and Boyer-Ahmad
- County: Dana
- Bakhsh: Kabgian
- Rural District: Chenar

Population (2006)
  - Total: 44
- Time zone: UTC+3:30 (IRST)
  - Summer (DST): UTC+4:30 (IRDT)

Dam-e Tang-e Shahid Deli Bajak (Persian: دم تنگ شهيددلي بجك, also Romanized as Dam-e Tang-e Shahīd Delī Bajak) is a village in Chenar Rural District, Kabgian District, Dana County, Kohgiluyeh and Boyer-Ahmad Province, Iran. At the 2006 census, its population was 44, in 11 families.
