= Dam Tang, Chaharmahal and Bakhtiari =

Dam Tang دم تنگ
- Village
- Location within Iran
- Coordinates: 32°14′04″N 50°13′26″E
- Country: Iran
- Province: Chaharmahal and Bakhtiari
- County: Kuhrang
- Bakhsh: Bazoft
- Rural District: Doab

Population (2006)
  - Total: 92
- Time zone: UTC+3:30 (IRST)
  - Summer (DST): UTC+4:30 (IRDT)

Dam Tang (Persian: دم تنگ; also known as Dam Tang Kūrā‘ī-ye Shāh Manşūrī) is a village in Doab Rural District, Bazoft District, Kuhrang County, Chaharmahal and Bakhtiari Province, Iran. At the 2006 census, its population was 92, in 16 families. The village is populated by Lurs.
