= Damtang-e Putu =

Damtang-e Putu دم تنگ پوتو
- Village
- Location within Iran
- Coordinates: 31°16′55″N 49°58′34″E
- Country: Iran
- Province: Khuzestan
- County: Bagh-e Malek
- Bakhsh: Meydavud
- Rural District: Saroleh

Population (2006)
  - Total: 86
- Time zone: UTC+3:30 (IRST)
  - Summer (DST): UTC+4:30 (IRDT)

Damtang-e Putu (Persian: دم تنگ پوتو, also Romanized as Damtang-e Pūtū) is a village in Saroleh Rural District, Meydavud District, Bagh-e Malek County, Khuzestan Province, Iran. At the time of the 2006 census, its population was 86, in 19 families.
