= Kaft Galleh Duk =

Kaft Galleh Duk كفت گله دوك
- Village
- Country: Iran
- Province: Khuzestan
- County: Lali
- Bakhsh: Hati
- Rural District: Hati

Population (2006)
  - Total: 20
- Time zone: UTC+3:30 (IRST)
  - Summer (DST): UTC+4:30 (IRDT)

Kaft Galleh Duk (Persian: كفت گله دوك, also Romanized as Kaft Galleh Dūk) is a village in Hati Rural District, Hati District, Lali County, Khuzestan Province, Iran. At the 2006 census, its population was 20, in 4 families.
