= Chahar Rah-e Tombal =

Chahar Rah-e Tombal چهارراه تمبل
- Village
- Location within Iran
- Coordinates: 32°18′53″N 49°12′33″E
- Country: Iran
- Province: Khuzestan
- County: Lali
- Bakhsh: Central
- Rural District: Sadat

Population (2006)
  - Total: 124
- Time zone: UTC+3:30 (IRST)
  - Summer (DST): UTC+4:30 (IRDT)

Chahar Rah-e Tombal (Persian: چهارراه تمبل, also Romanized as Chahār Rāh-e Tombal; also known as Tak Tombal) is a village in Sadat Rural District, in the Central District of Lali County, Khuzestan Province, Iran. At the 2006 census, its population was 124, in 16 families.
