= Bard Zard, Fars =

Bard Zard بردزرد
- Village
- Location within Iran
- Coordinates: 30°23′21″N 51°47′16″E
- Country: Iran
- Province: Fars
- County: Sepidan
- Bakhsh: Central
- Rural District: Khafri

Population (2006)
  - Total: 199
- Time zone: UTC+3:30 (IRST)
  - Summer (DST): UTC+4:30 (IRDT)

Bard Zard (Persian: بردزرد; also known as Bazūd) is a village in Khafri Rural District, in the Central District of Sepidan County, Fars province, Iran. At the time of the 2006 census, 49 families lived in the village, totaling a population of 199.
