= Dam-e Tang-e Molghun =

Dam-e Tang-e Molghun دم تنگ ملغون
- Village
- Location within Iran
- Coordinates: 30°29′00″N 51°05′00″E
- Country: Iran
- Province: Kohgiluyeh and Boyer-Ahmad
- County: Gachsaran
- Bakhsh: Central
- Rural District: Emamzadeh Jafar

Population (2006)
  - Total: 20
- Time zone: UTC+3:30 (IRST)
  - Summer (DST): UTC+4:30 (IRDT)

Dam-e Tang-e Molghun (Persian: دم تنگ ملغون, also Romanized as Dam-e Tang-e Molghūn; also known as Dam-e Tang) is a village in Emamzadeh Jafar Rural District, in the Central District of Gachsaran County, Kohgiluyeh and Boyer-Ahmad Province, Iran. At the 2006 census, its population was 20, in 6 families.
