= Dam Tang-e Sarna =

Dam Tang-e Sarna دم تنگ سرنا
- Village
- Location within Iran
- Coordinates: 30°45′20″N 51°19′14″E
- Country: Iran
- Province: Kohgiluyeh and Boyer-Ahmad
- County: Basht
- Bakhsh: Central
- Rural District: Kuh Mareh Khami

Population (2006)
  - Total: 34
- Time zone: UTC+3:30 (IRST)
  - Summer (DST): UTC+4:30 (IRDT)

Dam Tang-e Sarna (Persian: دم تنگ سرنا, also Romanized as Dam Tang-e Sarnā; also known as Dam-e Tang) is a village in Kuh Mareh Khami Rural District, in the Central District of Basht County, Kohgiluyeh and Boyer-Ahmad Province, Iran. At the 2006 census, its population was 34, in 7 families.
