= Bard Zard, Dehdez =

Bard Zard بردزرد
- Village
- Location within Iran
- Coordinates: 31°59′43″N 49°56′09″E
- Country: Iran
- Province: Khuzestan
- County: Izeh
- Bakhsh: Dehdez
- Rural District: Donbaleh Rud-e Shomali

Population (2006)
  - Total: 61
- Time zone: UTC+3:30 (IRST)
  - Summer (DST): UTC+4:30 (IRDT)

A partial view of Bard Zard, Dehdez, a small village in Khuzestan, Iran

Bard Zard (Persian: بردزرد) is a village in Donbaleh Rud-e Shomali Rural District, Dehdez District, Izeh County, Khuzestan Province, Iran. At the 2006 census, its population was 61, in 12 families.
