= Duk, Mazandaran =

Duk دوك
- Village
- Location within Iran
- Coordinates: 36°31′52″N 52°51′07″E
- Country: Iran
- Province: Mazandaran
- County: Qaem Shahr
- Bakhsh: Central
- Rural District: Nowkand Kola

Population (2006)
  - Total: 675
- Time zone: UTC+3:30 (IRST)
  - Summer (DST): UTC+4:30 (IRDT)

Duk (Persian: دوك, also Romanized as Dūk; also known as Dūk-e Bālā) is a village in Nowkand Kola Rural District, in the Central District of Qaem Shahr County, Mazandaran Province, Iran. At the 2006 census, its population was 675, in 192 families.
