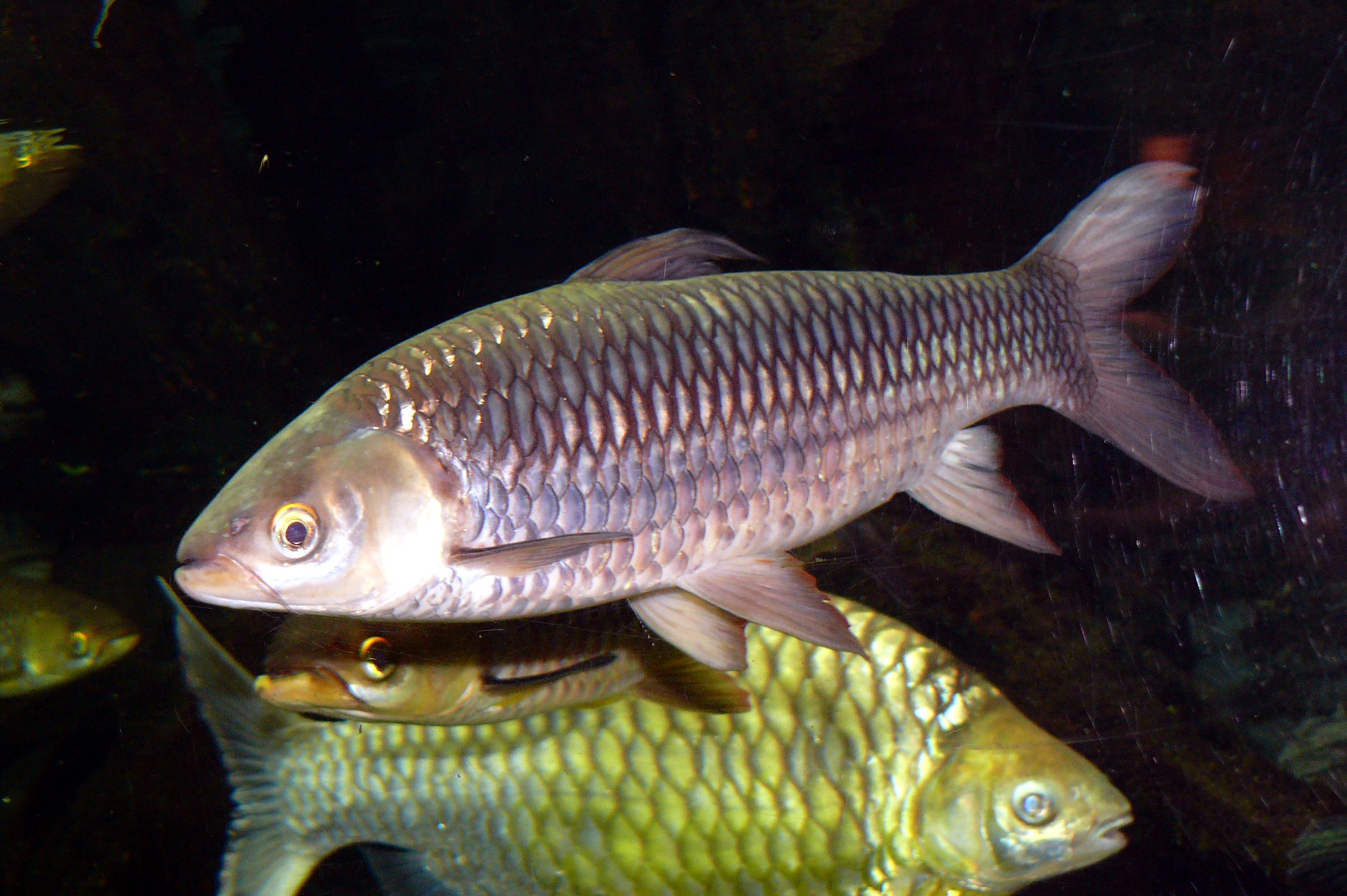

Conservation status
- Data Deficient (IUCN 3.1)

Scientific classification
- Kingdom: Animalia
- Phylum: Chordata
- Class: Actinopterygii
- Order: Cypriniformes
- Suborder: Cyprinoidei
- Family: Leptobarbidae
- Genus: Leptobarbus
- Species: L. rubripinna

Binomial name
- Leptobarbus rubripinna (Fowler, 1937)

Synonyms
- Filirasbora rubripinna Fowler, 1937

= Leptobarbus rubripinna =

Species of fish

Leptobarbus rubripinna, also known as the Sultan barb or red-finned cigar barb, is a species of freshwater ray-finned fish belonging to the family Leptobarbidae, the cigar barbs. This species is native to rivers and lakes in southeast Asia.

== Taxonomy ==
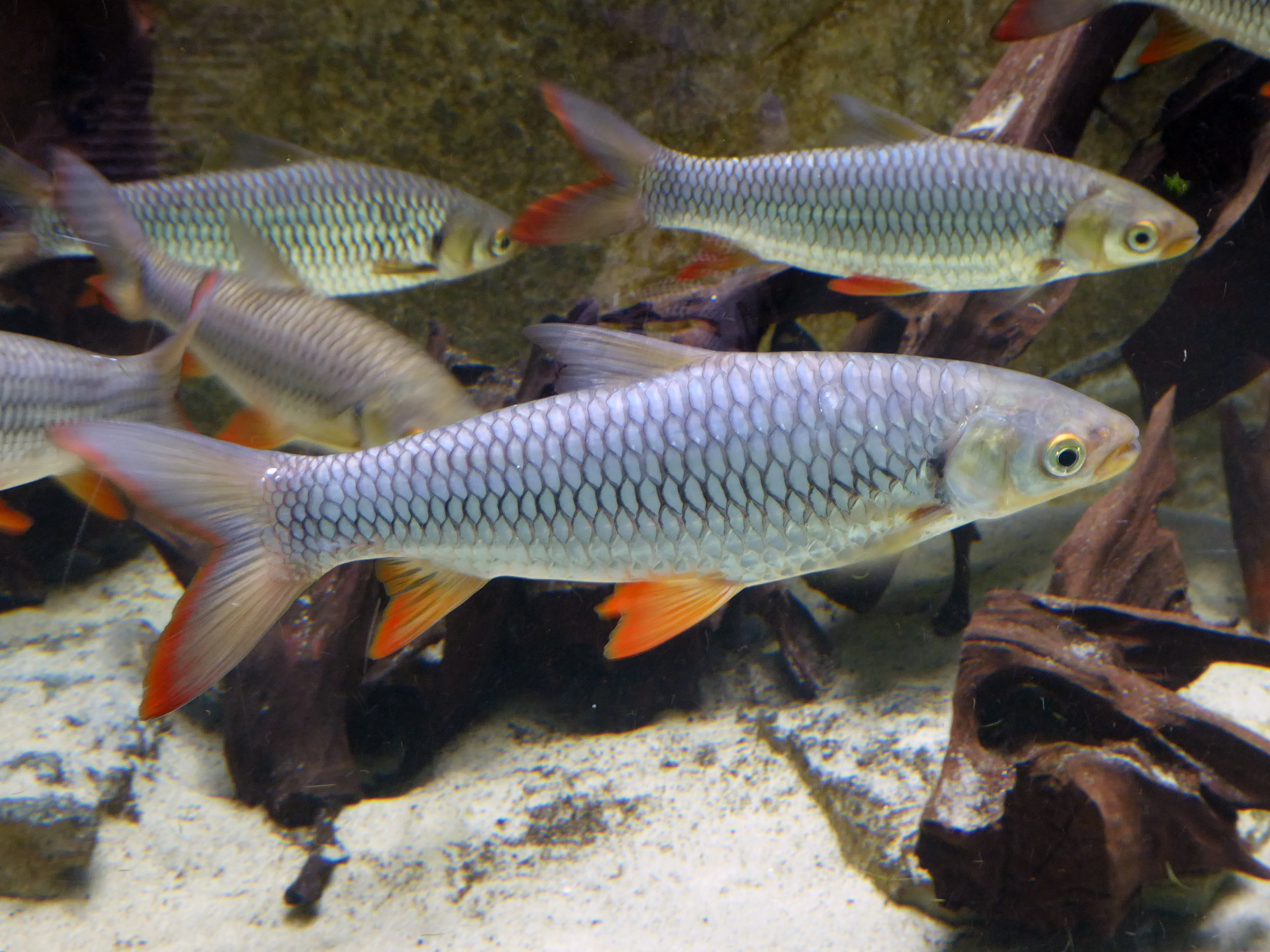
At Tallinn Zoo

It was until recently considered to be conspecific with Leptobarbus hoevenii, but it is now considered a separate species, although they share English vernacular names under which both species may appear in the aquarium trade. One of these names, "mad barb", refers to its behavior when apparently intoxicated after consuming some types of poisonous fruit.

== Distribution ==
It is a common but never abundant species that occurs in Thailand, Cambodia, Laos, and Vietnam in the drainages of the Mekong, Chao Praya, and Mae Klong rivers, where it is threatened by damming and deforestation, which destroys the seasonally flooded forest this species often feeds in.

== Habitat ==
L. rubripinna is a migratory species that moves from the deltas and estuaries upstream to spawn. This occurs in January and February in the Mekong, with the fish returning downstream in May and June. It feeds on insects and fruits, even poisonous fruits, and as a result of this diet its flesh sometimes becomes toxic, although this species is harvested by humans for food. Adult fish seem to prefer deeper areas in the river such as pools or slow-moving stretches, although they can also be found in faster-flowing stretches when feeding.

== In cultivation ==
As an aquarium fish, L. rubripinna grows too large for most tanks, reaching sizes of up to 1 meter in length, and is really only suitable for large public displays. It is a popular quarry for sport anglers in southeast Asia.
