= Landeh District =

Former district in Kohgiluyeh and Boyer-Ahmad province, Iran

Landeh District Persian: بخش لنده
- Former District
- Location within Iran
- Coordinates: 30°58′53″N 50°21′06″E
- Country: Iran
- Province: Kohgiluyeh and Boyer-Ahmad
- County: Kohgiluyeh
- Capital: Landeh

Population (2011)
  - Total: 21,367
- Time zone: UTC+3:30 (IRST)

Landeh District (Persian: بخش لنده) is a former administrative division of Kohgiluyeh County, Kohgiluyeh and Boyer-Ahmad province, Iran. Its capital was the city of Landeh.

== Demographics ==
=== Population ===
At the time of the 2006 National Census, the district's population was 21,151 in 3,973 households. The following census in 2011 counted 21,367 people in 4,584 households.

In 2013, the district was separated from the county in the establishment of Landeh County.

=== Administrative divisions ===
Landeh District Population
Administrative Divisions	2006	2011
Olya Tayeb RD	3,253	2,144
Tayebi-ye Garmsiri-ye Shomali RD	7,358	7,553
Landeh (city)	10,540	11,670
Total	21,151	21,367
RD = Rural District
