= Tayebi-ye Garmsiri-ye Shomali Rural District =

Rural district in Kohgiluyeh and Boyer-Ahmad province, Iran

Tayebi-ye Garmsiri-ye Shomali Rural District Persian: دهستان طيبي گرمسيرئ شمالي
- Rural District
- Location within Iran
- Coordinates: 30°59′15″N 50°22′40″E
- Country: Iran
- Province: Kohgiluyeh and Boyer-Ahmad
- County: Landeh
- District: Central
- Capital: Landeh

Population (2016)
  - Total: 3,990
- Time zone: UTC+3:30 (IRST)

Tayebi-ye Garmsiri-ye Shomali Rural District (Persian: دهستان طيبي گرمسيرئ شمالي) is in the Central District of Landeh County, Kohgiluyeh and Boyer-Ahmad province, Iran. It is administered from the city of Landeh.

== Demographics ==
=== Population ===
At the time of the 2006 National Census, the rural district's population (as a part of the former Landeh District of Kohgiluyeh County) was 7,358 in 1,386 households. There were 7,553 inhabitants in 1,599 households at the following census of 2011. The 2016 census measured the population of the rural district as 3,990 in 1,053 households, by which time the district had been separated from the county in the establishment of Landeh County. The rural district was transferred to the new Central District. The most populous of its 19 villages was Sar Asiab-e Landeh, with 1,312 people.
