= Olya Tayeb Rural District =

Rural district in Kohgiluyeh and Boyer-Ahmad province, Iran

Olya Tayeb Rural District Persian: دهستان عالي طيب
- Rural District
- Location within Iran
- Coordinates: 30°58′53″N 50°16′30″E
- Country: Iran
- Province: Kohgiluyeh and Boyer-Ahmad
- County: Landeh
- District: Central
- Capital: Chahar Rah-e Ali Tayyeb

Population (2016)
  - Total: 2,189
- Time zone: UTC+3:30 (IRST)

Olya Tayeb Rural District (Persian: دهستان عالي طيب) is in the Central District of Landeh County, Kohgiluyeh and Boyer-Ahmad province, Iran. Its capital is the village of Chahar Rah-e Ali Tayyeb.

== Demographics ==
=== Population ===
At the time of the 2006 National Census, the rural district's population (as a part of the former Landeh District of Kohgiluyeh County) was 3,253 in 596 households. There were 2,144 inhabitants in 502 households at the following census of 2011. The 2016 census measured the population of the rural district as 2,189 in 592 households, by which time the district had been separated from the county in the establishment of Landeh County. The rural district was transferred to the new Central District. The most populous of its 50 villages was Jan Khani, with 898 people.
