= Central District (Landeh County) =

District in Kohgiluyeh and Boyer-Ahmad province, Iran

Central District (Landeh County) Persian: بخش مرکزی شهرستان لنده
- District
- Location within Iran
- Coordinates: 30°58′53″N 50°17′57″E
- Country: Iran
- Province: Kohgiluyeh and Boyer-Ahmad
- County: Landeh
- Capital: Landeh

Population (2016)
  - Total: 18,951
- Time zone: UTC+3:30 (IRST)

The Central District of Landeh County (Persian: بخش مرکزی شهرستان لنده) is in Kohgiluyeh and Boyer-Ahmad province, Iran. Its capital is the city of Landeh.

== History ==
In 2013, Landeh District was separated from Kohgiluyeh County in the establishment of Landeh County, which was divided into two districts of two rural districts each, with Landeh as its capital and only city.

== Demographics ==
=== Population ===
At the time of the 2016 National Census, the district's population was 18,951 inhabitants in 4,851 households.

=== Administrative divisions ===
Central District (Landeh County) Population
Administrative Divisions	2016
Olya Tayeb RD	2,189
Tayebi-ye Garmsiri-ye Shomali RD	3,990
Landeh (city)	12,772
Total	18,951
RD = Rural District
