= Landeh County =

County in Kohgiluyeh and Boyer-Ahmad province, Iran

Landeh County Persian: شهرستان لنده
- County
- Location of Landeh County in Kohgiluyeh and Boyer-Ahmad province (top left, yellow)

- Location of Kohgiluyeh and Boyer-Ahmad province in Iran
- Coordinates: 30°58′53″N 50°21′06″E
- Country: Iran
- Province: Kohgiluyeh and Boyer-Ahmad
- Capital: Landeh
- Districts: Central, Mugarmun

Population (2016)
  - Total: 21,812
- Time zone: UTC+3:30 (IRST)

Landeh County (Persian: شهرستان لنده) is in Kohgiluyeh and Boyer-Ahmad province, Iran. Its capital is the city of Landeh.

== History ==
In 2013, Landeh District was separated from Kohgiluyeh County in the establishment of Landeh County, which was divided into two districts of two rural districts each, with Landeh as its capital and only city.

== Demographics ==
=== Population ===
At the time of the 2016 National Census, the county's population was 21,812 in 5,560 households.

=== Administrative divisions ===
Landeh County's population and administrative structure are shown in the following table.

Landeh County Population
Administrative Divisions	2016
Central District	18,951
Olya Tayeb RD	2,189
Tayebi-ye Garmsiri-ye Shomali RD	3,990
Landeh (city)	12,772
Mugarmun District	2,861
Shitab RD	1,997
Vahdat RD	864
Total	21,812
RD = Rural District

== See also ==
Media related to Landeh County at Wikimedia Commons
