= Gerdab =

Gerdab or Gerd Ab (Persian: گرداب) may refer to:

- Gerdab-e Olya, Chaharmahal and Bakhtiari
- Gerdab-e Sofla, Chaharmahal and Bakhtiari Province
- Gerdab-e Piazi, Fars Province
- Gerdab, Hormozgan
- Gerdab, Isfahan
- Gerdab, Kerman
- Gerdab, Khuzestan
- Gardab-e Yek, Khuzestan Province
- Gerdab-e Kebir, Kohgiluyeh and Boyer-Ahmad Province
- Gerdab-e Olya, Kohgiluyeh and Boyer-Ahmad
- Gerdab-e Saqaveh, Kohgiluyeh and Boyer-Ahmad Province
- Gerdab, Lorestan
- Gerd Ab, Mazandaran

== See also ==
- Gardab (disambiguation)
- Gerdab-e Olya (disambiguation)
