= Emamzadeh Hasan =

Village in Chaharmahal and Bakhtiari province, Iran

Emamzadeh Hasan Persian: امامزاده حسن
- Village
- Location within Iran
- Coordinates: 31°12′24″N 51°07′43″E
- Country: Iran
- Province: Chaharmahal and Bakhtiari
- County: Falard
- District: Emamzadeh Hasan
- Rural District: Parvaz

Population (2016)
  - Total: 522
- Time zone: UTC+3:30 (IRST)

Emamzadeh Hasan (Persian: امامزاده حسن) (Note: Also romanized as Emāmzādeh Ḩasan; formerly known as Emamzadeh Darvishan (امامزاده درويشان), also romanized as Emāmzādeh Darvīshān) is a village in Parvaz Rural District of Emamzadeh Hasan District in Falard County, Chaharmahal and Bakhtiari province, Iran.

== Demographics ==
=== Ethnicity ===
The village is populated by Lurs.

=== Population ===
At the time of the 2006 National Census, the village's population was 476 in 94 households, when it was in Poshtkuh Rural District of Falard District (Note: Renamed the Central District of Falard County) in Lordegan County. The following census in 2011 counted 474 people in 101 households. The 2016 census measured the population of the village as 522 people in 140 households.

In 2022, the district was separated from the county in the establishment of Falard County and renamed the Central District. The rural district was transferred to the new Emamzadeh Hasan District, and Emamzadeh Hasan was transferred to Parvaz Rural District created in the district.
