= Monarjan =

Village in Chaharmahal and Bakhtiari province, Iran

Monarjan Persian: منارجان
- Village
- Location within Iran
- Coordinates: 31°16′29″N 51°07′11″E
- Country: Iran
- Province: Chaharmahal and Bakhtiari
- County: Falard
- District: Emamzadeh Hasan
- Rural District: Parvaz

Population (2016)
  - Total: 517
- Time zone: UTC+3:30 (IRST)

Monarjan (Persian: منارجان) (Note: Also romanized as Monārjān; also known as Monādejān and Monādelān) is a village in Parvaz Rural District of Emamzadeh Hasan District in Falard County, Chaharmahal and Bakhtiari province, Iran.

== Demographics ==
=== Ethnicity ===
The village is populated by Lurs.

=== Population ===
At the time of the 2006 National Census, the village's population was 405 in 95 households, when it was in Poshtkuh Rural District of Falard District (Note: Renamed the Central District of Falard County) in Lordegan County. The following census in 2011 counted 433 people in 106 households. The 2016 census measured the population of the village as 517 people in 141 households.

In 2022, the district was separated from the county in the establishment of Falard County and renamed the Central District. The rural district was transferred to the new Emamzadeh Hasan District, and Monarjan was transferred to Parvaz Rural District created in the district.
