= Vahdat (disambiguation) =

Vahdat is a city in Tajikistan.

Vahdat or Vakhdat may also refer to the following places:

== Iran ==
- Vahdat Rural District (Fardis County), an administrative division of Alborz province
- Vahdat Rural District (Zarand County), an administrative division of Kerman province
- Vahdat, Kermanshah, a village in Eslamabad-e Gharb County, Kermanshah province
- Vahdat, Khuzestan, a neighborhood in the city of Shahiyun, Dezful County, Khuzestan province
- Vahdatabad-e Mugarmun, a village in Landeh County, Kohgiluyeh and Boyer-Ahmad province
- Vahdat Rural District (Landeh County), an administrative division of Kohgiluyeh and Boyer-Ahmad province
- Vahdat Hall, a performing arts complex in Tehran, Tehran province

== Tajikistan ==
- Vahdat District, a district in Tajikistan's Region of Republican Subordination
- Vahdat Palace or Palace of Unity, a convention center in Tajikistan's capital, Dushanbe
- Vahdat, Gorno-Badakhshan (formerly: Midenshor), a village in Shughnon District, Gorno-Badakhshan Autonomous Region
- Vahdat, Lakhsh District (formerly: Jirgatol), a town in Lakhsh District
- Vahdat, Sughd, an administrative division in Devashtich District, Sughd Region
- Vahdat, Shahriston District, a village in Shahriston District, Sughd Region
