= Dam Ab, Falard =

Village in Chaharmahal and Bakhtiari province, Iran

Dam Ab Persian: دم اب
- Village
- Location within Iran
- Coordinates: 31°15′30″N 51°10′33″E
- Country: Iran
- Province: Chaharmahal and Bakhtiari
- County: Falard
- District: Emamzadeh Hasan
- Rural District: Poshtkuh

Population (2016)
  - Total: 777
- Time zone: UTC+3:30 (IRST)

Dam Ab (Persian: دم اب) (Note: Also romanized as Dam Āb) is a village in Poshtkuh Rural District of Emamzadeh Hasan District in Falard County, Chaharmahal and Bakhtiari province, Iran.

== Demographics ==
=== Ethnicity ===
The village is populated by Lurs.

=== Population ===
At the time of the 2006 National Census, the village's population was 805 in 171 households, when it was in Falard District (Note: Renamed the Central District of Falard County) of Lordegan County. The following census in 2011 counted 841 people in 222 households. The 2016 census measured the population of the village as 777 people in 245 households.

In 2022, the district was separated from the county in the establishment of Falard County and renamed the Central District. The rural district was transferred to the new Emamzadeh Hasan District.
