= Qaleh Sukhteh, Chaharmahal and Bakhtiari =

Village in Chaharmahal and Bakhtiari province, Iran

Qaleh Sukhteh Persian: قلعه سوخته
- Village
- Location within Iran
- Coordinates: 31°17′52″N 51°07′11″E
- Country: Iran
- Province: Chaharmahal and Bakhtiari
- County: Falard
- District: Emamzadeh Hasan
- Rural District: Parvaz

Population (2016)
  - Total: 962
- Time zone: UTC+3:30 (IRST)

Qaleh Sukhteh (Persian: قلعه سوخته) (Note: Also romanized as Qal'eh Sūkhteh and Qal'eh-ye Sūkhteh; also known as Qal'eh Sūkhta) is a village in, and the capital of, Parvaz Rural District in Emamzadeh Hasan District of Falard County, Chaharmahal and Bakhtiari province, Iran. It was the capital of Poshtkuh Rural District until its capital was transferred to the village of Darreh Namdari.

== Demographics ==
=== Ethnicity ===
The village is populated by Lurs.

=== Population ===
At the time of the 2006 National Census, the village's population was 877 in 179 households, when it was in Poshtkuh Rural District of Falard District (Note: Renamed the Central District of Falard County) in Lordegan County. The following census in 2011 counted 1,085 people in 248 households. The 2016 census measured the population of the village as 962 people in 239 households.

In 2022, the district was separated from the county in the establishment of Falard County and renamed the Central District. The rural district was transferred to the new Emamzadeh Hasan District, and Qaleh Sukhteh was transferred to Parvaz Rural District created in the district.
