= Darreh Namdari =

Village in Chaharmahal and Bakhtiari province, Iran

Darreh Namdari Persian: دره نامداري
- Village
- Location within Iran
- Coordinates: 31°18′54″N 51°06′38″E
- Country: Iran
- Province: Chaharmahal and Bakhtiari
- County: Falard
- District: Emamzadeh Hasan
- Rural District: Poshtkuh

Population (2016)
  - Total: 439
- Time zone: UTC+3:30 (IRST)

Darreh Namdari (Persian: دره نامداري) (Note: Also romanized as Darreh Nāmdārī) is a village in, and the capital of, Poshtkuh Rural District in Emamzadeh Hasan District of Falard County, Chaharmahal and Bakhtiari province, Iran. The previous capital of the rural district was the village of Qaleh Sukhteh.

== Demographics ==
=== Ethnicity ===
The village is populated by Lurs.

=== Population ===
At the time of the 2006 National Census, the village's population was 338 in 66 households, when it was in Falard District. (Note: Renamed the Central District of Falard County) The following census in 2011 counted 395 people in 91 households. The 2016 census measured the population of the village as 439 people in 116 households.

In 2022, the district was separated from the county in the establishment of Falard County and renamed the Central District. The rural district was transferred to the new Emamzadeh Hasan District.
