= Parvaz =

Parvaz or Parvaaz may refer to:

== Arts and entertainment ==
- Parvaaz, a 1999 album by Junoon
- Parvaaz (band), an Indian band
- Parvaaz: The Journey, a 2021 Indian film

== People ==
- Dorothy Parvaz (born 1971), Iranian-born journalist
- Parvaz Homay (born 1980), Iranian composer and performer
- Parvaz Mirza (1970–1995), English cricketer

== Places ==
- Parvaz, Afghanistan, a village
- Parvaz, Iran, a village
- Parvaz Rural District, Iran

== See also ==
- Parvīz, a Persian name
