= Safidar, Chaharmahal and Bakhtiari =

Village in Chaharmahal and Bakhtiari province, Iran

Safidar Persian: سفيدار
- Village
- Location within Iran
- Coordinates: 31°17′22″N 51°08′59″E
- Country: Iran
- Province: Chaharmahal and Bakhtiari
- County: Falard
- District: Emamzadeh Hasan
- Rural District: Poshtkuh

Population (2016)
  - Total: 489
- Time zone: UTC+3:30 (IRST)

Safidar (Persian: سفيدار) (Note: Also romanized as Safīdār) is a village in Poshtkuh Rural District of Emamzadeh Hasan District in Falard County, Chaharmahal and Bakhtiari province, Iran.

== Demographics ==
=== Ethnicity ===
The village is populated by Lurs.

=== Population ===
At the time of the 2006 National Census, the village's population was 442 in 89 households, when it was in Falard District (Note: Renamed the Central District of Falard County) of Lordegan County. The following census in 2011 counted 490 people in 112 households. The 2016 census measured the population of the village as 489 people in 123 households.

In 2022, the district was separated from the county in the establishment of Falard County and renamed the Central District. The rural district was transferred to the new Emamzadeh Hasan District.
