= Golabi =

Golabi (Persian: گلابي) may refer to:

- Golabi-ye Olya, Chaharmahal and Bakhtiari Province
- Golabi-ye Sofla, Chaharmahal and Bakhtiari Province
- Golabi, Hormozgan
