= Amiran (disambiguation) =

Amiran is a village in Isfahan Province, Iran.

Amiran (Persian: اميران) may also refer to:

== Places ==
- Amiran-e Olya, Chaharmahal and Bakhtiari Province
- Amiran-e Sofla, Chaharmahal and Bakhtiari Province
- Amiran, Hormozgan

== People ==
As given name:

- Amiran or Umrao Jaan, a fictional courtesan, protagonist of the 1899 Indian novel Umrao Jaan Ada by Mirza Hadi Ruswa
- Amiran Amirkhanov (born 1985), Armenian basketball player
- Amiran Chichinadze (1934-2007), Georgian screenwriter and actor
- Amiran Dvir (born 1973), Israeli musician
- Amiran Dyakonov, Ossetian politician
- Amiran Kardanov (born 1976), Russian and Greek freestyle wrestler
- Amiran Khuskivadze (born 1933), Georgian physicist, cyberneticist, philosopher and author
- Amiran Mujiri (born 1974), Georgian footballer
- Amiran Papinashvili (born 1988), Georgian judoka
- Amiran Revishvili, Georgian cardiac electrophysiologist
- Amiran Sanaia (born 1989), Georgian professional footballer
- Amiran Shavadze (born 1993),Georgian Greco-Roman wrestler
- Amiran Shkalim (born 1988), Israeli footballer
- Amiran Totikashvili (born 1969), Soviet-Georgian judoka

As surname:

- David Amiran (Horst Kallner; 1910–2003), German and Israeli geoscientist, Israel Prize recipient
- Emanuel Amiran-Pougatchov (1909-1993), Polish-Israeli composer and teacher
- Ruth Amiran (1914-2005), Israeli archeologist

== See also ==
- Chehel Amiran (disambiguation)
