= Kondar, Chaharmahal and Bakhtiari =

Village in Chaharmahal and Bakhtiari province, Iran

Kondar Persian: كندر
- Village
- Location within Iran
- Coordinates: 31°19′20″N 51°13′40″E
- Country: Iran
- Province: Chaharmahal and Bakhtiari
- County: Falard
- District: Central
- Rural District: Shahriar

Population (2016)
  - Total: 747
- Time zone: UTC+3:30 (IRST)

Kondar (Persian: كندر) (Note: Also romanized as Kondor; also known as Falat) is a village in Shahriar Rural District of the Central District (Note: Formerly Falard District of Lordegan County) in Falard County, Chaharmahal and Bakhtiari province, Iran.

== Demographics ==
=== Ethnicity ===
The village is populated by Lurs.

=== Population ===
At the time of the 2006 National Census, the village's population was 609 in 147 households, when it was in Falard Rural District of Falard District (Note: Renamed the Central District of Falard County) in Lordegan County. The following census in 2011 counted 739 people in 205 households. The 2016 census measured the population of the village as 747 people in 211 households.

In 2022, the district was separated from the county in the establishment of Falard County and renamed the Central District. Kondar was transferred to Shahriar Rural District created in the district.
