= Chahar Deh, Chaharmahal and Bakhtiari =

Village in Chaharmahal and Bakhtiari province, Iran

Chahar Deh Persian: چهارده
- Village
- Location within Iran
- Coordinates: 31°21′36″N 51°13′30″E
- Country: Iran
- Province: Chaharmahal and Bakhtiari
- County: Falard
- District: Central
- Rural District: Shahriar

Population (2016)
  - Total: 856
- Time zone: UTC+3:30 (IRST)

Chahar Deh (Persian: چهارده) (Note: Also romanized as Chahār Deh) is a village in Shahriar Rural District of the Central District (Note: Formerly Falard District of Lordegan County) in Falard County, Chaharmahal and Bakhtiari province, Iran.

== Demographics ==
=== Ethnicity ===
The village is populated by Lurs.

=== Population ===
At the time of the 2006 National Census, the village's population was 762 in 184 households, when it was in Falard Rural District of Falard District (Note: Renamed the Central District of Falard County) in Lordegan County. The following census in 2011 counted 933 people in 244 households. The 2016 census measured the population of the village as 856 people in 270 households.

In 2022, the district was separated from the county in the establishment of Falard County and renamed the Central District. Chahar Deh was transferred to Shahriar Rural District created in the district.
