= Qarah, Iran =

Village in Chaharmahal and Bakhtiari province, Iran

Qarah Persian: قرح
- Village
- Location within Iran
- Coordinates: 31°14′19″N 51°14′46″E
- Country: Iran
- Province: Chaharmahal and Bakhtiari
- County: Falard
- District: Central
- Rural District: Falard

Population (2016)
  - Total: 1,429
- Time zone: UTC+3:30 (IRST)

Qarah (Persian: قرح) (Note: Also romanized as Qaraḩ) is a village in Falard Rural District of the Central District (Note: Formerly Falard District of Lordegan County) in Falard County, Chaharmahal and Bakhtiari province, Iran.

== Demographics ==
=== Population ===
At the time of the 2006 National Census, the village's population was 1,229 in 278 households, when it was in Falard Rural District of Falard District (Note: Renamed the Central District of Falard County) in Lordegan County. The following census in 2011 counted 1,507 people in 369 households. The 2016 census measured the population of the village as 1,429 people in 387 households.

In 2022, the district was separated from the county in the establishment of Falard County and renamed the Central District.
