= Shahriar, Chaharmahal and Bakhtiari =

Village in Chaharmahal and Bakhtiari province, Iran

Shahriar Persian: شهريار
- Village
- Location within Iran
- Coordinates: 31°20′30″N 51°13′27″E
- Country: Iran
- Province: Chaharmahal and Bakhtiari
- County: Falard
- District: Central
- Rural District: Shahriar

Population (2016)
  - Total: 2,076
- Time zone: UTC+3:30 (IRST)

Shahriar (Persian: شهريار) (Note: Also romanized as Shahrīār and Shahryār) is a village in, and the capital of, Shahriar Rural District in the Central District (Note: Formerly Falard District of Lordegan County) of Falard County, Chaharmahal and Bakhtiari province, Iran.

== Demographics ==
=== Ethnicity ===
The village is populated by Lurs.

=== Population ===
At the time of the 2006 National Census, the village's population was 2,123 in 438 households, when it was in Falard Rural District of Falard District (Note: Renamed the Central District of Falard County) in Lordegan County. The following census in 2011 counted 2,211 people in 563 households. The 2016 census measured the population of the village as 2,076 people in 614 households. It was the most populous village in its rural district.

In 2022, the district was separated from the county in the establishment of Falard County and renamed the Central District. Shahriar was transferred to Shahriar Rural District created in the district.
