= Ab Gavan =

Ab Gavan (Persian: ابگاون) may refer to:

- Ab Gavan-e Bozorg
- Ab Gavan-e Kuchek
