= Nehzat-e Olya =

Nehzat-e Olya نهضت عليا
- Village
- Location within Iran
- Coordinates: 31°00′16″N 50°29′37″E
- Country: Iran
- Province: Kohgiluyeh and Boyer-Ahmad
- County: Landeh
- Bakhsh: Mugarmun
- Rural District: Vahdat

Population (2006)
  - Total: 52
- Time zone: UTC+3:30 (IRST)
  - Summer (DST): UTC+4:30 (IRDT)

Nehzat-e Olya (Persian: نهضت عليا, also Romanized as Nehẕat-e ‘Olyā; also known as Nehẕat and Shāhrokhī) is a village in Vahdat Rural District, Mugarmun District, Landeh County, Kohgiluyeh and Boyer-Ahmad Province, Iran. In the 2006 census, its population was 52, with 10 families.
