= Sahlabad, Chaharmahal and Bakhtiari =

Village in Chaharmahal and Bakhtiari province, Iran

Sahlabad Persian: سهل اباد
- Village
- Location within Iran
- Coordinates: 31°17′22″N 51°12′26″E
- Country: Iran
- Province: Chaharmahal and Bakhtiari
- County: Falard
- District: Central
- Rural District: Falard

Population (2016)
  - Total: 1,171
- Time zone: UTC+3:30 (IRST)

Sahlabad (Persian: سهل اباد) (Note: Also romanized as Sahlābād) is a village in Falard Rural District of the Central District (Note: Formerly Falard District of Lordegan County) in Falard County, Chaharmahal and Bakhtiari province, Iran.

== Demographics ==
=== Ethnicity ===
The village is populated by Lurs.

=== Population ===
At the time of the 2006 National Census, the village's population was 964 in 176 households, when it was in Falard Rural District of Falard District (Note: Renamed the Central District of Falard County) in Lordegan County. The following census in 2011 counted 1,114 people in 276 households. The 2016 census measured the population of the village as 1,171 people in 311 households.

In 2022, the district was separated from the county in the establishment of Falard County and renamed the Central District.
