= Sar Tang-e Mugarmun =

Sar Tang-e Mugarmun سرتنگ موگرمون
- Village
- Location within Iran
- Coordinates: 30°59′57″N 50°29′56″E
- Country: Iran
- Province: Kohgiluyeh and Boyer-Ahmad
- County: Landeh
- Bakhsh: Mugarmun
- Rural District: Vahdat

Population (2006)
  - Total: 34
- Time zone: UTC+3:30 (IRST)
  - Summer (DST): UTC+4:30 (IRDT)

Sar Tang-e Mugarmun (Persian: سرتنگ موگرمون, also Romanized as Sar Tang-e Mūgarmūn; also known as Sar Tang-e Āzādī) is a village in Vahdat Rural District, Mugarmun District, Landeh County, Kohgiluyeh and Boyer-Ahmad Province, Iran. At the 2006 census, its population was 34, in 5 families.
