= Falard =

Falard (Persian: فلارد) may refer to:

- Falard District
- Falard Rural District
