= Delkun =

Delkun دلكون
- Village
- Location within Iran
- Coordinates: 31°03′19″N 50°29′27″E
- Country: Iran
- Province: Kohgiluyeh and Boyer-Ahmad
- County: Landeh
- Bakhsh: Mugarmun
- Rural District: Vahdat

Population (2006)
  - Total: 104
- Time zone: UTC+3:30 (IRST)
  - Summer (DST): UTC+4:30 (IRDT)

Delkun (Persian: دلكون, also Romanized as Delkūn; also known as Delkan) is a village in Vahdat Rural District, Mugarmun District, Landeh County, Kohgiluyeh and Boyer-Ahmad Province, Iran. At the 2006 census, its population was 104, in 21 families.
