= Salmanak =

Salmanak (Persian: سلمانك) may refer to:

- Salmanak-e Olya
- Salmanak-e Sofla
