= Sandejan =

Sandejan (Persian: سندجان), also rendered as Sandegan or Sendegan, may refer to:

- Sandejan-e Olya
- Sandejan-e Sofla
