= Shahrak-e Emam Khomeyni, Chaharmahal and Bakhtiari =

Village in Chaharmahal and Bakhtiari province, Iran

Shahrak-e Emam Khomeyni Persian: شهرك امام خميني
- Village
- Location within Iran
- Country: Iran
- Province: Chaharmahal and Bakhtiari
- County: Falard
- District: Central
- Rural District: Falard

Population (2016)
  - Total: 748
- Time zone: UTC+3:30 (IRST)

Shahrak-e Emam Khomeyni (Persian: شهرك امام خميني) (Note: Also romanized as Shahrak-e Emām Khomeynī; also known as Emāmkhomeynī) is a village in Falard Rural District of the Central District (Note: Formerly Falard District of Lordegan County) in Falard County, Chaharmahal and Bakhtiari province, Iran.

== Demographics ==
=== Ethnicity ===
The village is populated by Lurs.

=== Population ===
At the time of the 2006 National Census, the village's population was 255 in 51 households, when it was in Falard Rural District of Falard District (Note: Renamed the Central District of Falard County) in Lordegan County. The following census in 2011 counted 461 people in 94 households. The 2016 census measured the population of the village as 748 people in 162 households.

In 2022, the district was separated from the county in the establishment of Falard County and renamed the Central District.
