= Abu Eshaq =

Abu Eshaq or Abueshaq (Persian: ابواسحق) may refer to:

- Abu Eshaq-e Olya
- Abu Eshaq-e Sofla
