= Gardab =

Gardab (Persian: گرداب) may refer to:

- Gardab 1
- Gardab 2

== See also ==
- Gerdab (disambiguation)
