= Gerdkalat =

Gerdkalat گردكلات
- Village
- Location within Iran
- Coordinates: 31°02′23″N 50°26′39″E
- Country: Iran
- Province: Kohgiluyeh and Boyer-Ahmad
- County: Landeh
- Bakhsh: Mugarmun
- Rural District: Vahdat

Population (2006)
  - Total: 60
- Time zone: UTC+3:30 (IRST)
  - Summer (DST): UTC+4:30 (IRDT)

Gerdkalat (Persian: گردكلات, also Romanized as Gerdkalāt) is a village in Vahdat Rural District, Mugarmun District, Landeh County, Kohgiluyeh and Boyer-Ahmad Province, Iran. At the 2006 census, its population was 60, in 11 families.
