= Kalvari-ye Sofla =

Village in Chaharmahal and Bakhtiari province, Iran

Kalvari-ye Sofla Persian: كلواري سفلي
- Village
- Location within Iran
- Coordinates: 31°17′24″N 51°13′59″E
- Country: Iran
- Province: Chaharmahal and Bakhtiari
- County: Falard
- District: Central
- Rural District: Falard

Population (2016)
  - Total: 829
- Time zone: UTC+3:30 (IRST)

Kalvari-ye Sofla (Persian: كلواري سفلي) (Note: Also romanized as Kalvārī-ye Soflá) is a village in, and the capital of, Falard Rural District in the Central District (Note: Formerly Falard District of Lordegan County) of Falard County, Chaharmahal and Bakhtiari province, Iran. The rural district was previously administered from the city of Mal-e Khalifeh.

== Demographics ==
=== Ethnicity ===
The village is populated by Lurs.

=== Population ===
At the time of the 2006 National Census, the village's population was 576 in 112 households, when it was in Falard District (Note: Renamed the Central District of Falard County) of Lordegan County. The following census in 2011 counted 661 people in 154 households. The 2016 census measured the population of the village as 829 people in 215 households.

In 2022, the district was separated from the county in the establishment of Falard County and renamed the Central District.
