= Tall-e Qaleh-ye Mugarmun =

Tall-e Qaleh-ye Mugarmun تل قلعه موگرمون
- Village
- Country: Iran
- Province: Kohgiluyeh and Boyer-Ahmad
- County: Landeh
- Bakhsh: Mugarmun
- Rural District: Vahdat

Population (2006)
  - Total: 34
- Time zone: UTC+3:30 (IRST)
  - Summer (DST): UTC+4:30 (IRDT)

Tall-e Qaleh-ye Mugarmun (Persian: تل قلعه موگرمون, also Romanized as Tall-e Qal‘eh-ye Mūgarmūn) is a village in Vahdat Rural District, Mugarmun District, Landeh County, Kohgiluyeh and Boyer-Ahmad Province, Iran. At the 2006 census, its population was 34, in 7 families.
