= Shah Najaf =

Village in Chaharmahal and Bakhtiari province, Iran

Shah Najaf Persian: شاه نجف
- Village
- Location within Iran
- Coordinates: 31°18′34″N 51°07′20″E
- Country: Iran
- Province: Chaharmahal and Bakhtiari
- County: Falard
- District: Emamzadeh Hasan
- Rural District: Poshtkuh

Population (2016)
  - Total: 1,131
- Time zone: UTC+3:30 (IRST)

Shah Najaf (Persian: شاه نجف) (Note: Also romanized as Shāh Najaf and Shāh-e Najaf) is a village in Poshtkuh Rural District of Emamzadeh Hasan District in Falard County, Chaharmahal and Bakhtiari province, Iran, serving as capital of the district.

== Demographics ==
=== Population ===
At the time of the 2006 National Census, the village's population was 779 in 179 households, when it was in Falard District (Note: Renamed the Central District of Falard County) of Lordegan County. The following census in 2011 counted 1,277 people in 305 households. The 2016 census measured the population of the village as 1,131 people in 307 households. It was the most populous village in its rural district.

In 2022, the district was separated from the county in the establishment of Falard County and renamed the Central District. The rural district was transferred to the new Emamzadeh Hasan District.
