= Yunaki =

Village in Chaharmahal and Bakhtiari province, Iran

Yunaki Persian: يونكي
- Village
- Location within Iran
- Coordinates: 31°15′48″N 51°14′01″E
- Country: Iran
- Province: Chaharmahal and Bakhtiari
- County: Falard
- District: Central
- Rural District: Falard

Population (2016)
  - Total: 1,449
- Time zone: UTC+3:30 (IRST)

Yunaki (Persian: يونكي) (Note: Also romanized as Yūnakī and Yūnekī; also known as Vanakī) is a village in Falard Rural District of the Central District (Note: Formerly Falard District of Lordegan County) in Falard County, Chaharmahal and Bakhtiari province, Iran.

== Demographics ==
=== Ethnicity ===
The village is populated by Lurs.

=== Population ===
At the time of the 2006 National Census, the village's population was 1,307 in 287 households, when it was in Falard Rural District of Falard District (Note: Renamed the Central District of Falard County) in Lordegan County. The following census in 2011 counted 1,337 people in 336 households. The 2016 census measured the population of the village as 1,449 people in 404 households.

In 2022, the district was separated from the county in the establishment of Falard County and renamed the Central District.
