= Tall-e Quchan =

Tall-e Quchan (Persian: تل قوچان) may refer to:

- Tall-e Quchan, Khuzestan
- Tall-e Quchan, Kohgiluyeh and Boyer-Ahmad
