= Dasht-e Naseri =

Dasht-e Naseri دشت ناصري
- Village
- Location within Iran
- Coordinates: 31°01′04″N 50°29′41″E
- Country: Iran
- Province: Kohgiluyeh and Boyer-Ahmad
- County: Landeh
- Bakhsh: Mugarmun
- Rural District: Vahdat

Population (2006)
  - Total: 132
- Time zone: UTC+3:30 (IRST)
  - Summer (DST): UTC+4:30 (IRDT)

Dasht-e Naseri (Persian: دشت ناصري, also Romanized as Dasht-e Nāşerī; also known as Nāşerī) is a village in Vahdat Rural District, Mugarmun District, Landeh County, Kohgiluyeh and Boyer-Ahmad Province, Iran. At the 2006 census, its population was 132, in 25 families.
