= Guliston, Shahriston District =

Guliston
- Location in Tajikistan
- Coordinates: 39°48′N 68°47′E
- Country: Tajikistan
- Region: Sughd Region
- District: Shahriston District

Guliston (Tajik: Гулистон, formerly Qarapchi) is a village in Sughd Region, northern Tajikistan. It is part of the jamoat Bunjikat in Shahriston District.

== Etymology ==
The name Gulistan and captions of that name are very common in the Persian speaking world and it means Rose Garden.
