= Munah =

Village in Kohgiluyeh and Boyer-Ahmad province, Iran

Munah Persian: مونه
- Village
- Location within Iran
- Coordinates: 31°01′50″N 50°23′07″E
- Country: Iran
- Province: Kohgiluyeh and Boyer-Ahmad
- County: Landeh
- District: Mugarmun
- Rural District: Shitab

Population (2016)
  - Total: 433
- Time zone: UTC+3:30 (IRST)

Munah (Persian: مونه) (Note: Also romanized as Mūnah and Mūneh) is a village in Shitab Rural District of Mugarmun District, Landeh County, Kohgiluyeh and Boyer-Ahmad province, Iran.

== Demographics ==
=== Population ===
At the time of the 2006 National Census, the village's population was 551 in 111 households, when it was in Tayebi-ye Garmsiri-ye Shomali Rural District of the former Landeh District of Kohgiluyeh County. The following census in 2011 counted 466 people in 89 households. The 2016 census measured the population of the village as 433 people in 107 households, by which time the district had been separated from the county in the establishment of Landeh County. The rural district was transferred to the new Central District, and Munah was transferred to Shitab Rural District created in the new Mugarmun District. It was the most populous village in its rural district.
