= Deh-e Golabi-ye Olya =

Deh-e Golabi-ye Olya ده گلابي عليا
- Village
- Location within Iran
- Coordinates: 31°17′41″N 51°13′32″E
- Country: Iran
- Province: Chaharmahal and Bakhtiari
- County: Lordegan
- Bakhsh: Falard
- Rural District: Falard

Population (2006)
  - Total: 281
- Time zone: UTC+3:30 (IRST)
  - Summer (DST): UTC+4:30 (IRDT)

Deh-e Golabi-ye Olya (Persian: ده گلابي عليا, also Romanized as Deh-e Golābī-ye ‘Olyā; also known as Golābī-ye Bālā) is a village in Falard Rural District, Falard District, Lordegan County, Chaharmahal and Bakhtiari Province, Iran. At the 2006 census, its population was 281, in 58 families. The village is populated by Lurs.
