= Chilhujra, Shahristan District =

Tursunzoda
- Location in Tajikistan
- Coordinates: 39°45′3″N 68°46′33″E
- Country: Tajikistan
- Region: Sughd Region
- District: Shahriston District
- Official languages: Russian (Interethnic); Tajik (State)

Tursunzoda (Russian and Tajik: Турсунзода, formerly Jarqutan) is a village in Sughd Region, northern Tajikistan. It is part of the jamoat Shahriston in Shahriston District.
