= Gerdab-e Kebir =

Gerdab-e Kebir گرداب كبير
- Village
- Location within Iran
- Coordinates: 31°02′30″N 50°28′25″E
- Country: Iran
- Province: Kohgiluyeh and Boyer-Ahmad
- County: Landeh
- Bakhsh: Mugarmun
- Rural District: Vahdat

Population (2006)
  - Total: 158
- Time zone: UTC+3:30 (IRST)
  - Summer (DST): UTC+4:30 (IRDT)

Gerdab-e Kebir (Persian: گرداب كبير, also Romanized as Gerdāb-e Kebīr; also known as Gerdāb-e Soflá) is a village in Vahdat Rural District, Mugarmun District, Landeh County, Kohgiluyeh and Boyer-Ahmad Province, Iran. At the 2006 census, its population was 158, in 27 families.
