= Istiqlol, Shahriston District =

Istiqlol
- Location in Tajikistan
- Coordinates: 39°43′12″N 68°52′49″E
- Country: Tajikistan
- Region: Sughd Region
- District: Shahriston District

Istiqlol (Tajik: Истиқлол, formerly Kengkul or Kemkul) is a village in Sughd Region, northern Tajikistan. It is part of the jamoat Shahriston in Shahriston District.
