= Golabi-ye Sofla =

Golabi-ye Sofla گلابي سفلي
- Village
- Location within Iran
- Coordinates: 31°17′33″N 51°13′33″E
- Country: Iran
- Province: Chaharmahal and Bakhtiari
- County: Lordegan
- Bakhsh: Falard
- Rural District: Falard

Population (2006)
  - Total: 26
- Time zone: UTC+3:30 (IRST)
  - Summer (DST): UTC+4:30 (IRDT)

Golabi-ye Sofla (Persian: گلابي سفلي, also Romanized as Golābī-ye Soflá; also known as Golābī-ye Pā‘īn) is a village in Falard Rural District, Falard District, Lordegan County, Chaharmahal and Bakhtiari Province, Iran. At the 2006 census, its population was 26, in 6 families. The village is populated by Lurs.
