= Murjan =

Murjan (Persian: مورجان or مورجن) may refer to:

- Murjan, Fars (مورجان - Mūrjān)
- Murjan, Kohgiluyeh and Boyer-Ahmad (مورجن - Mūrjan)
