= Abu Eshaq-e Olya =

Village in Chaharmahal and Bakhtiari province, Iran

Abu Eshaq-e Olya Persian: ابواسحق عليا
- Village
- Location within Iran
- Coordinates: 31°19′54″N 51°16′52″E
- Country: Iran
- Province: Chaharmahal and Bakhtiari
- County: Falard
- District: Central
- Rural District: Falard

Population (2016)
  - Total: 781
- Time zone: UTC+3:30 (IRST)

Abu Eshaq-e Olya (Persian: ابواسحق عليا) (Note: Also romanized as Abū Esḥaq-e ‘Olyā; also known as Abūesḥaq-e ‘Olyā) is a village in Falard Rural District of the Central District (Note: Formerly Falard District of Lordegan County) in Falard County, Chaharmahal and Bakhtiari province, Iran.

== Demographics ==
=== Ethnicity ===
The village is populated by Lurs.

=== Population ===
At the time of the 2006 National Census, the village's population was 1,107 in 246 households, when it was in Falard Rural District of Falard District (Note: Renamed the Central District of Falard County) in Lordegan County. The following census in 2011 counted 1,039 people in 249 households. The 2016 census measured the population of the village as 781 people in 233 households.

In 2022, the district was separated from the county in the establishment of Falard County and renamed the Central District.
