= Abu Eshaq-e Sofla =

Abu Eshaq-e Sofla ابواسحق سفلي
- Village
- Location within Iran
- Coordinates: 31°19′43″N 51°16′37″E
- Country: Iran
- Province: Chaharmahal and Bakhtiari
- County: Lordegan
- Bakhsh: Falard
- Rural District: Falard

Population (2006)
  - Total: 543
- Time zone: UTC+3:30 (IRST)
  - Summer (DST): UTC+4:30 (IRDT)

Abu Eshaq-e Sofla (Persian: ابواسحق سفلي, also Romanized as Abū Esḥaq-e Soflá; also known as Abūesḥaq-e Soflá) is a village in Falard Rural District, Falard District, Lordegan County, Chaharmahal and Bakhtiari Province, Iran. At the 2006 census, its population was 543, in 124 families. The village is populated by Lurs.
