= Obodi =

- Location in Tajikistan
- Coordinates: 39°50′23″N 68°49′59″E
- Country: Tajikistan
- Region: Sughd Region
- District: Shahriston District
- Official languages: Russian (Interethnic); Tajik (State) (Note: Constitution of Tajikistan)

Obodi (Russian: Ободи; Tajik: Ободӣ, formerly Kholdorqipchoq) is a village in Sughd Region, northern Tajikistan. It is part of the jamoat Bunjikat in Shahriston District.
