= Gerdab-e Olya =

Gerdab-e Olya (Persian: گرداب عليا) may refer to:

- Gerdab-e Olya, Chaharmahal and Bakhtiari
- Gerdab-e Olya, Kohgiluyeh and Boyer-Ahmad
