= Tall-e Quchan, Kohgiluyeh and Boyer-Ahmad =

Tall-e Quchan تل قوچان
- Village
- Country: Iran
- Province: Kohgiluyeh and Boyer-Ahmad
- County: Landeh
- Bakhsh: Mugarmun
- Rural District: Vahdat

Population (2006)
  - Total: 34
- Time zone: UTC+3:30 (IRST)
  - Summer (DST): UTC+4:30 (IRDT)

Tall-e Quchan (Persian: تل قوچان, also Romanized as Tall-e Qūchān) is a village in Vahdat Rural District, Mugarmun District, Landeh County, Kohgiluyeh and Boyer-Ahmad Province, Iran. At the 2006 census, its population was 34, in 7 families.
