= Salmanak-e Olya =

Salmanak-e Olya سلمانك عليا
- Village
- Location within Iran
- Coordinates: 31°16′28″N 51°14′17″E
- Country: Iran
- Province: Chaharmahal and Bakhtiari
- County: Lordegan
- Bakhsh: Falard
- Rural District: Falard

Population (2006)
  - Total: 64
- Time zone: UTC+3:30 (IRST)
  - Summer (DST): UTC+4:30 (IRDT)

Salmanak-e Olya (Persian: سلمانك عليا, also Romanized as Salmānak-e ‘Olyā) is a village in Falard Rural District, Falard District, Lordegan County, Chaharmahal and Bakhtiari Province, Iran. At the 2006 census, its population was 64, in 14 families. The village is populated by Lurs.
