= Salmanak-e Sofla =

Salmanak-e Sofla سلمانك سفلي
- Village
- Location within Iran
- Coordinates: 31°16′13″N 51°14′00″E
- Country: Iran
- Province: Chaharmahal and Bakhtiari
- County: Lordegan
- Bakhsh: Falard
- Rural District: Falard

Population (2006)
  - Total: 79
- Time zone: UTC+3:30 (IRST)
  - Summer (DST): UTC+4:30 (IRDT)

Salmanak-e Sofla (Persian: سلمانك سفلي, also Romanized as Salmānak-e Soflá) is a village in Falard Rural District, Falard District, Lordegan County, Chaharmahal and Bakhtiari Province, Iran. At the 2006 census, its population was 79, in 15 families. The village is populated by Lurs.
