= Sandejan-e Sofla =

Village in Chaharmahal and Bakhtiari province, Iran

Sandejan-e Sofla Persian: سندجان سفلي
- Village
- Location within Iran
- Country: Iran
- Province: Chaharmahal and Bakhtiari
- County: Falard
- District: Central
- Rural District: Falard

Population (2016)
  - Total: 816
- Time zone: UTC+3:30 (IRST)

Sandejan-e Sofla (Persian: سندجان سفلي) (Note: Also romanized as Sandejān-e Soflá; also known as Sandegān, Sandegān-e Pā’īn, Sandegān-e Soflá, and Sendegān) is a village in Falard Rural District of the Central District (Note: Formerly Falard District of Lordegan County) in Falard County, Chaharmahal and Bakhtiari province, Iran.

== Demographics ==
=== Ethnicity ===
The village is populated by Lurs.

=== Population ===
At the time of the 2006 National Census, the village's population was 892 in 175 households, when it was in Falard Rural District of Falard District (Note: Renamed the Central District of Falard County) in Lordegan County. The following census in 2011 counted 901 people in 247 households. The 2016 census measured the population of the village as 816 people in 255 households.

In 2022, the district was separated from the county in the establishment of Falard County and renamed the Central District.
