= Chashmasor =

Chashmasor may refer to the following places in Tajikistan:

- Chashmasor, Fayzobod District, a village and jamoat in Fayzobod District
- Chashmasor, Ghafurov District, a jamoat in Ghafurov District
- Chashmasor, Shahriston District, a village in Shahriston District
