= Sandejan-e Olya =

Village in Chaharmahal and Bakhtiari province, Iran

Sandejan-e Olya Persian: سندجان عليا
- Village
- Location within Iran
- Country: Iran
- Province: Chaharmahal and Bakhtiari
- County: Falard
- District: Central
- Rural District: Falard

Population (2016)
  - Total: 1,035
- Time zone: UTC+3:30 (IRST)

Sandejan-e Olya (Persian: سندجان عليا) (Note: Also romanized as Sandejān-e ‘Olyā; also known as Sandegān-e ‘Olyā) is a village in Falard Rural District of the Central District (Note: Formerly Falard District of Lordegan County) in Falard County, Chaharmahal and Bakhtiari province, Iran.

== Demographics ==
=== Ethnicity ===
The village is populated by Lurs.

=== Population ===
At the time of the 2006 National Census, the village's population was 848 in 173 households, when it was in Falard Rural District of Falard District (Note: Renamed the Central District of Falard County) in Lordegan County. The following census in 2011 counted 789 people in 211 households. The 2016 census measured the population of the village as 1,035 people in 302 households.

In 2022, the district was separated from the county in the establishment of Falard County and renamed the Central District.
