= Amiran-e Olya =

Amiran-e Olya اميران عليا
- Village
- Location within Iran
- Coordinates: 31°19′52″N 51°14′01″E
- Country: Iran
- Province: Chaharmahal and Bakhtiari
- County: Lordegan
- Bakhsh: Falard
- Rural District: Falard

Population (2006)
  - Total: 68
- Time zone: UTC+3:30 (IRST)
  - Summer (DST): UTC+4:30 (IRDT)

Amiran-e Olya (Persian: اميران عليا, also Romanized as Amīrān-e ‘Olyā and Amīrān ‘Olyā; also known as Amīrān and Amīrān-e Bālā) is a village in Falard Rural District, Falard District, Lordegan County, Chaharmahal and Bakhtiari Province, Iran. At the 2006 census, its population was 68, in 15 families. The village is populated by Lurs.
