= Gerdab-e Sofla =

Gerdab-e Sofla گرداب سفلي
- Village
- Location within Iran
- Coordinates: 31°14′03″N 51°15′17″E
- Country: Iran
- Province: Chaharmahal and Bakhtiari
- County: Lordegan
- Bakhsh: Falard
- Rural District: Falard

Population (2006)
  - Total: 567
- Time zone: UTC+3:30 (IRST)
  - Summer (DST): UTC+4:30 (IRDT)

Gerdab-e Sofla (Persian: گرداب سفلي, also Romanized as Gerdāb-e Soflá) is a village in Falard Rural District, Falard District, Lordegan County, Chaharmahal and Bakhtiari Province, Iran. At the 2006 census, its population was 567, in 126 families. The village is populated by Lurs.
