= Firdavsi =

- Location in Tajikistan
- Coordinates: 39°42′27″N 68°43′45″E
- Country: Tajikistan
- Region: Sughd Region
- District: Shahriston District

Firdavsi (Tajik: Фирдавсӣ, formerly Buragen) is a village in Sughd Region, northern Tajikistan. It is part of the jamoat Shahriston in Shahriston District. It is located on the M34 highway.
