= Aliyari =

Aliyari is a surname. Notable people with the surname include:

- Majid Aliyari (born 1996), Iranian footballer
- Mehdi Aliyari (born 1989), Iranian sport wrestler
- Reza Aliyari (born 1994), Iranian footballer

== See also ==
- Bonah Aliyari, a town in Kohgiluyeh and Boyer-Ahmad province
