= Ab Gavan-e Kuchek =

Ab Gavan-e Kuchek اب گاون كوچك
- Village
- Location within Iran
- Coordinates: 31°04′05″N 50°30′53″E
- Country: Iran
- Province: Kohgiluyeh and Boyer-Ahmad
- County: Landeh
- Bakhsh: Mugarmun
- Rural District: Vahdat

Population (2006)
  - Total: 71
- Time zone: UTC+3:30 (IRST)
  - Summer (DST): UTC+4:30 (IRDT)

Ab Gavan-e Kuchek (Persian: اب گاون كوچك, also Romanized as Āb Gāvān-e Kūchek) is a village in Vahdat Rural District, Mugarmun District, Landeh County, Kohgiluyeh and Boyer-Ahmad Province, Iran. At the 2006 census, its population was 71, in 12 families.
