= Parvaz, Iran =

Parvaz پروز
- Village
- Location within Iran
- Coordinates: 31°13′22″N 51°09′21″E
- Country: Iran
- Province: Chaharmahal and Bakhtiari
- County: Lordegan
- Bakhsh: Falard
- Rural District: Poshtkuh

Population (2006)
  - Total: 107
- Time zone: UTC+3:30 (IRST)
  - Summer (DST): UTC+4:30 (IRDT)

Parvaz (Persian: پروز, also Romanized as Pervaz) is a village in Poshtkuh Rural District, Falard District, Lordegan County, Chaharmahal and Bakhtiari Province, Iran. At the 2006 census, its population was 107, in 20 families. The village is populated by Lurs.
