= Buston, Shahriston District =

Buston
- Location in Tajikistan
- Coordinates: 39°43′N 68°48′E
- Country: Tajikistan
- Region: Sughd Region
- District: Shahriston District

Buston (Tajik: Бӯстон, formerly Ishqili) is a village in Sughd Region, northern Tajikistan. It is part of the jamoat Shahriston in Shahriston District.
