= Amiran-e Sofla =

Amiran-e Sofla اميران سفلي
- Village
- Location within Iran
- Coordinates: 31°19′40″N 51°14′20″E
- Country: Iran
- Province: Chaharmahal and Bakhtiari
- County: Lordegan
- Bakhsh: Falard
- Rural District: Falard

Population (2006)
  - Total: 84
- Time zone: UTC+3:30 (IRST)
  - Summer (DST): UTC+4:30 (IRDT)

Amiran-e Sofla (Persian: اميران سفلي, also Romanized as Amīrān-e Soflá; also known as Amīrān-e Pā’īn) is a village in Falard Rural District, Falard District, Lordegan County, Chaharmahal and Bakhtiari Province, Iran. At the 2006 census, its population was 84, in 18 families. The village is populated by Lurs.
