= Murjan, Kohgiluyeh and Boyer-Ahmad =

Murjan مورجن
- Village
- Location within Iran
- Coordinates: 31°00′23″N 50°28′34″E
- Country: Iran
- Province: Kohgiluyeh and Boyer-Ahmad
- County: Landeh
- Bakhsh: Mugarmun
- Rural District: Vahdat

Population (2006)
  - Total: 88
- Time zone: UTC+3:30 (IRST)
  - Summer (DST): UTC+4:30 (IRDT)

Murjan (Persian: مورجن, also Romanized as Mūrjan) is a village in Vahdat Rural District, Mugarmun District, Landeh County, Kohgiluyeh and Boyer-Ahmad Province, Iran. At the 2006 census, its population was 88, in 16 families.
