= Gerdab-e Olya, Chaharmahal and Bakhtiari =

Gerdab-e Olya گرداب عليا
- Village
- Location within Iran
- Coordinates: 31°23′30″N 51°12′14″E
- Country: Iran
- Province: Chaharmahal and Bakhtiari
- County: Lordegan
- Bakhsh: Falard
- Rural District: Falard

Population (2006)
  - Total: 374
- Time zone: UTC+3:30 (IRST)
  - Summer (DST): UTC+4:30 (IRDT)

Gerdab-e Olya (Persian: گرداب عليا, also Romanized as Gerdāb-e ‘Olyā) is a village in Falard Rural District, Falard District, Lordegan County, Chaharmahal and Bakhtiari Province, Iran. At the 2006 census, its population was 374, in 66 families. The village is populated by Lurs.
