= Shitab =

Village in Kohgiluyeh and Boyer-Ahmad province, Iran

Shitab Persian: شيتاب
- Village
- Location within Iran
- Coordinates: 31°00′04″N 50°25′21″E
- Country: Iran
- Province: Kohgiluyeh and Boyer-Ahmad
- County: Landeh
- District: Mugarmun
- Rural District: Shitab

Population (2016)
  - Total: 411
- Time zone: UTC+3:30 (IRST)

Shitab (Persian: شيتاب) (Note: Also romanized as Shītāb; also known as Shīrlūb) is a village in Shitab Rural District of Mugarmun District, Landeh County, Kohgiluyeh and Boyer-Ahmad province, Iran, serving as capital of both the district and the rural district.

== Demographics ==
=== Population ===
At the time of the 2006 National Census, the village's population was 430 in 76 households, when it was in Tayebi-ye Garmsiri-ye Shomali Rural District of the former Landeh District of Kohgiluyeh County. The following census in 2011 counted 418 people in 82 households. The 2016 census measured the population of the village as 411 people in 106 households, by which time the district had been separated from the county in the establishment of Landeh County. The rural district was transferred to the new Central District, and Shitab was transferred to Shitab Rural District created in the new Mugarmun District.
