= Shahristan, Tajikistan =

Shahristan Tajik: Шахристон Persian: شهرستان
- Village and Jamoat
- Location in Tajikistan Shahristan (West and Central Asia)
- Coordinates: 39°46′N 68°49′E
- Country: Tajikistan
- Region: Sughd Region
- District: Shahristan District

Population (2015)
  - Total: 22,903
- Time zone: UTC+5 (TJT)
- Official languages: Russian (Interethnic); Tajik (State)

Shahristan (Tajik: Шахристон; Persian: شهرستان ) is a village and jamoat in north-west Tajikistan. It is located in Shahristan District in the central part of Sughd Region. It is the administrative center of Shahristan District. The jamoat has a total population of 22,903 (2015). It consists of 12 villages, including Shahristan (the seat), Buston, Chashmasor, Firdavsi, Istiqlol, Tursunzoda and Vahdat.

The archaeological site of Bunjikat is located nearby.

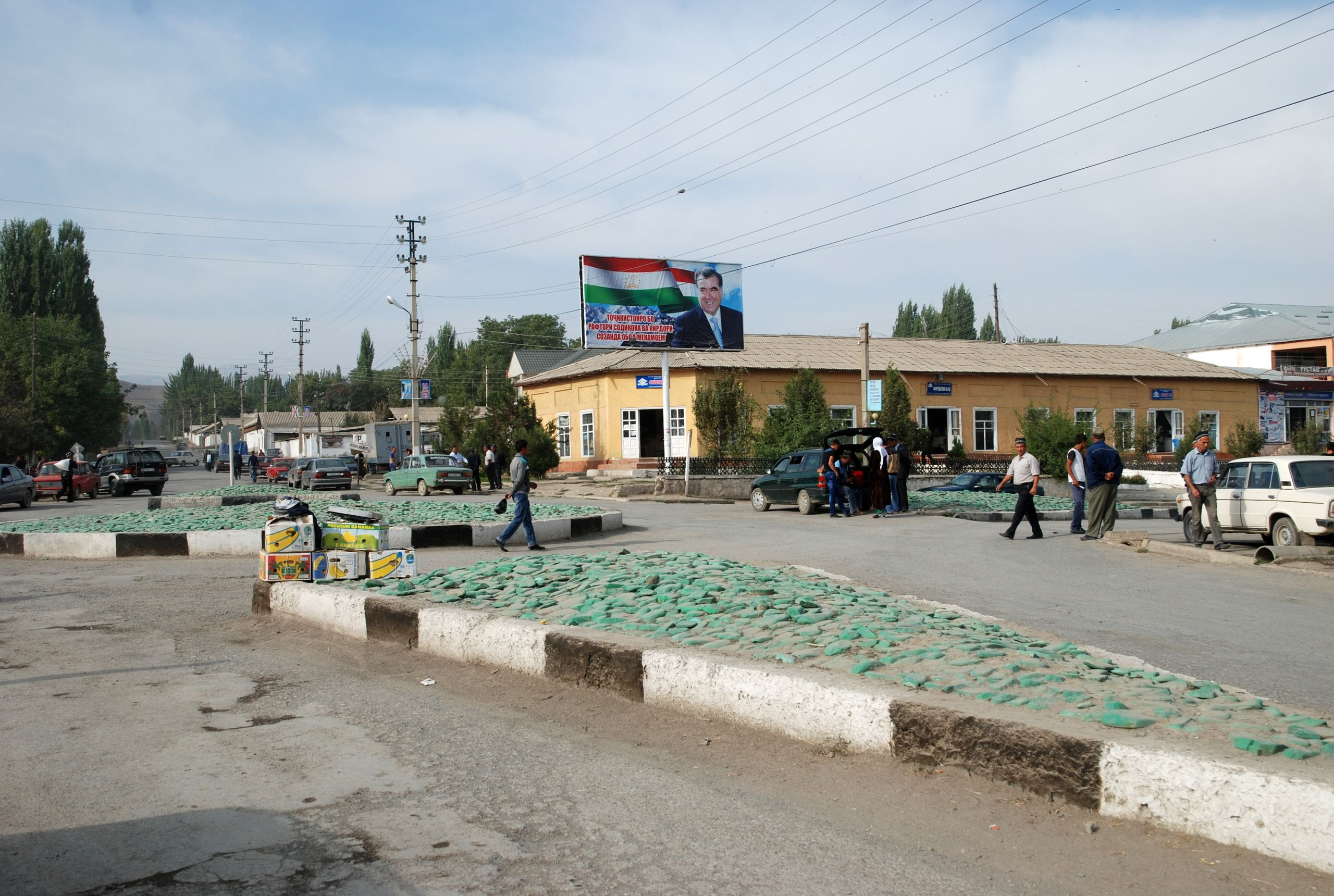
Shahristan, center.

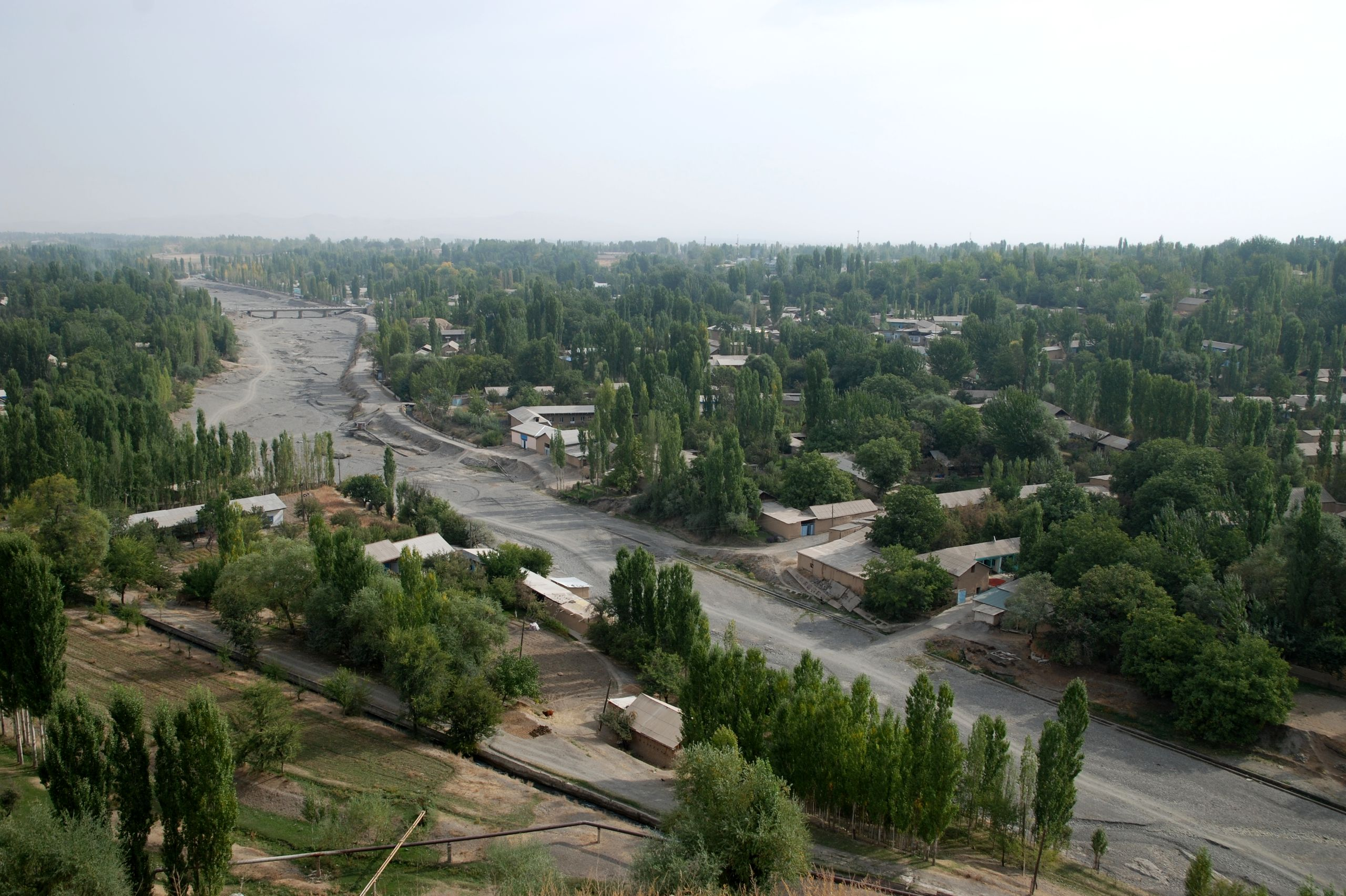
Shahristan, river.

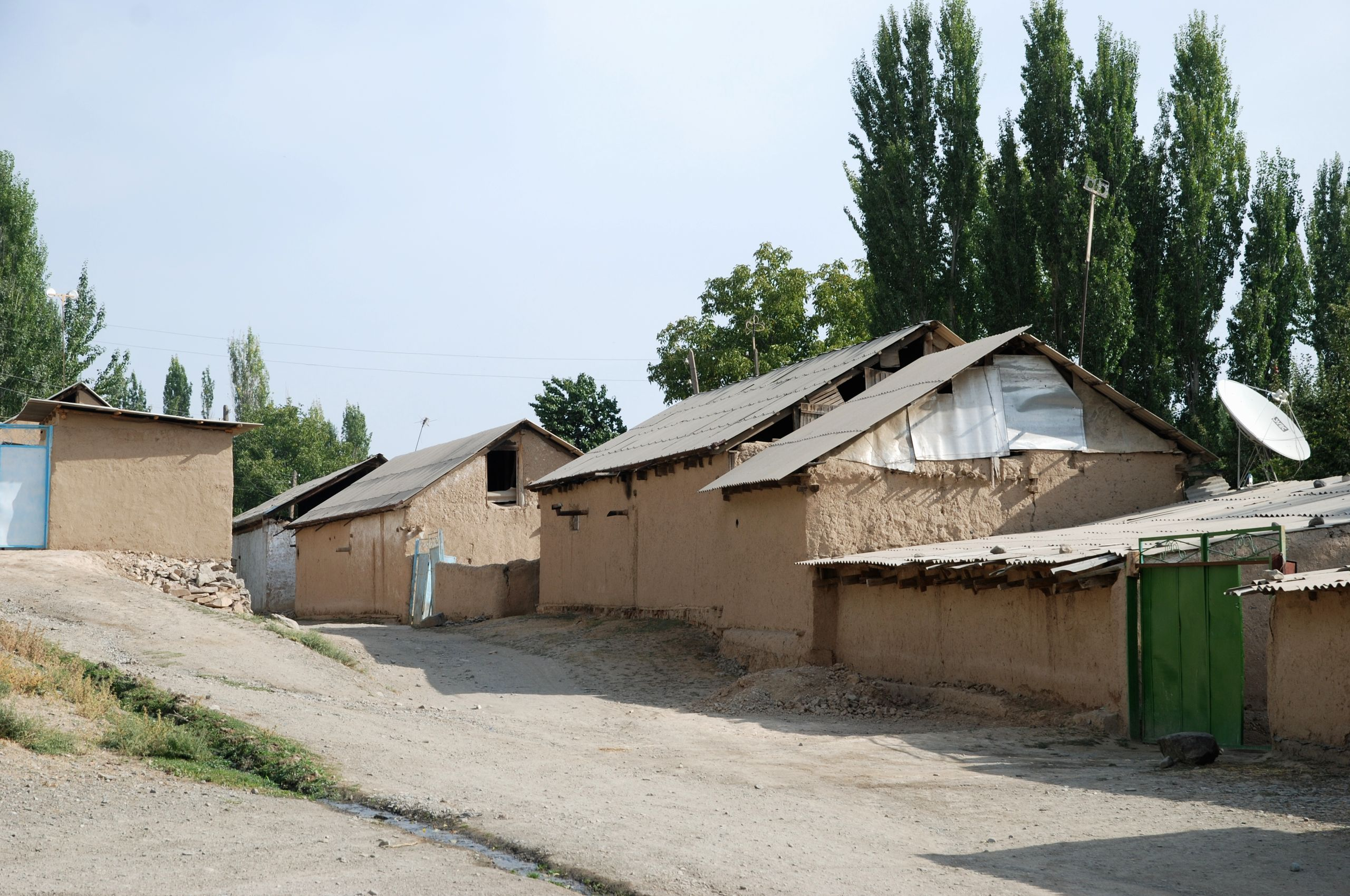
Shahristan, village.
