= Shitab Rural District =

Rural district in Kohgiluyeh and Boyer-Ahmad province, Iran

Shitab Rural District Persian: دهستان شيتاب
- Rural District
- Location within Iran
- Coordinates: 31°01′29″N 50°24′12″E
- Country: Iran
- Province: Kohgiluyeh and Boyer-Ahmad
- County: Landeh
- District: Mugarmun
- Capital: Shitab

Population (2016)
  - Total: 1,997
- Time zone: UTC+3:30 (IRST)

Shitab Rural District (Persian: دهستان شيتاب) is in Mugarmun District of Landeh County, Kohgiluyeh and Boyer-Ahmad province, Iran. Its capital is the village of Shitab.

== History ==
In 2013, Landeh District was separated from Kohgiluyeh County in the establishment of Landeh County, and Shitab Rural District was created in the new Mugarmun District.

== Demographics ==
=== Population ===
At the time of the 2016 National Census, the rural district's population was 1,997 in 489 households. The most populous of its 12 villages was Munah, with 433 people.
