= Bunjikat =

Town and jamoat in north-west Tajikistan

Bunjikat Russian: Бунчикат Tajik: Бунҷикат
- Jamoat
- Location in Tajikistan
- Coordinates: 39°48′13″N 68°48′12″E
- Country: Tajikistan
- Region: Sughd Region
- District: Shahriston District

Population (2015)
  - Total: 15,344
- Time zone: UTC+5 (TJT)

Bunjikat (Russian: Бунчикат; Tajik: Бунҷикат, formerly: Yangiqurghon, Tajik: Янгӣқурғон; Persian: ینگی‌قرغان) is a jamoat in north-west Tajikistan. It is in Shahriston District in Sughd Region. The jamoat has a total population of 15,344 (2015). It consists of 7 villages, including Guliston (the seat), Obodi and Sebzor.

The archaeological site of Bunjikat is the location of the former capital of the Principality of Ushrusana.
