= Vahdatabad-e Mugarmun =

Village in Kohgiluyeh and Boyer-Ahmad province, Iran

Vahdatabad-e Mugarmun Persian: وحدت اباد موگرمون
- Village
- Location within Iran
- Coordinates: 31°01′11″N 50°28′20″E
- Country: Iran
- Province: Kohgiluyeh and Boyer-Ahmad
- County: Landeh
- District: Mugarmun
- Rural District: Vahdat

Population (2016)
  - Total: 102
- Time zone: UTC+3:30 (IRST)

Vahdatabad-e Mugarmun (Persian: وحدت ابادموگرمون) (Note: Also romanized as Vaḩdatābād-e Mūgarmūn; also known as Deh-e Vaḩdat and Vaḩdat) is a village in, and the capital of, Vahdat Rural District, Mugarmun District, Landeh County, Kohgiluyeh and Boyer-Ahmad province, Iran.

== Demographics ==
=== Population ===
At the time of the 2006 National Census, the village's population was 226 in 39 households, when it was in Tayebi-ye Garmsiri-ye Shomali Rural District of the former Landeh District of Kohgiluyeh County. The following census in 2011 counted 187 people in 38 households. The 2016 census measured the population of the village as 102 people in 26 households, by which time the district had been separated from the county in the establishment of Landeh County. The rural district was transferred to the new Central District, and Vahdatabad-e Mugarmun was transferred to Vahdat Rural District created in the new Mugarmun District.
