= Parvaz Rural District =

Rural district in Chaharmahal and Bakhtiari province, Iran

Parvaz Rural District Persian: دهستان پروز
- Rural District
- Location within Iran
- Coordinates: 31°14′N 51°08′E
- Country: Iran
- Province: Chaharmahal and Bakhtiari
- County: Falard
- District: Emamzadeh Hasan
- Established: 2022
- Capital: Qaleh Sukhteh
- Time zone: UTC+3:30 (IRST)

Parvaz Rural District (Persian: دهستان پروز) is in Emamzadeh Hasan District of Falard County, Chaharmahal and Bakhtiari province, Iran. Its capital is the village of Qaleh Sukhteh, whose population at the time of the 2016 National Census was 962 in 239 households.

== History ==
In 2022, Falard District (Note: Renamed the Central District of Falard County) was separated from Lordegan County in the establishment of Falard County and renamed the Central District. Parvaz Rural District was created in the new Emamzadeh Hasan District.

== Other villages in the rural district ==
- Aliabad
- Emamzadeh Hasan
- Monarjan
