= Bonah Aliyari =

Village in Kohgiluyeh and Boyer-Ahmad province, Iran

Bonah Aliyari Persian: بنه علي ياري
- Village
- Location within Iran
- Coordinates: 31°01′22″N 50°29′27″E
- Country: Iran
- Province: Kohgiluyeh and Boyer-Ahmad
- County: Landeh
- District: Mugarmun
- Rural District: Vahdat

Population (2016)
  - Total: 187
- Time zone: UTC+3:30 (IRST)

Bonah Aliyari (Persian: بنه علي ياري) (Note: Also romanized as Bonah ʿAlīyārī) is a village in Vahdat Rural District, Mugarmun District, Landeh County, Kohgiluyeh and Boyer-Ahmad province, Iran.

== Demographics ==
=== Population ===
At the time of the 2006 National Census, the village's population was 233 in 46 households, when it was in Tayebi-ye Garmsiri-ye Shomali Rural District of the former Landeh District of Kohgiluyeh County. The following census in 2011 counted 231 people in 45 households. The 2016 census measured the population of the village as 187 people in 48 households, by which time the district had been separated from the county in the establishment of Landeh County. The rural district was transferred to the new Central District, and Bonah Aliyari was transferred to Vahdat Rural District created in the new Mugarmun District. It was the most populous village in its rural district.
