= Gerdab-e Olya, Kohgiluyeh and Boyer-Ahmad =

Gerdab-e Olya گرداب عليا
- Village
- Location within Iran
- Coordinates: 31°02′39″N 50°27′19″E
- Country: Iran
- Province: Kohgiluyeh and Boyer-Ahmad
- County: Landeh
- Bakhsh: Mugarmun
- Rural District: Vahdat

Population (2006)
  - Total: 68
- Time zone: UTC+3:30 (IRST)
  - Summer (DST): UTC+4:30 (IRDT)

Gerdab-e Olya (Persian: گرداب عليا, also Romanized as Gerdāb-e ‘Olyā; also known as Gerdāb and Gerdāb Bālā) is a village in Vahdat Rural District, Mugarmun District, Landeh County, Kohgiluyeh and Boyer-Ahmad Province, Iran. At the 2006 census, its population was 68, in 14 families.
