= Chashmasor, Shahriston District =

Chashmasor
- Location in Tajikistan
- Coordinates: 39°49′20″N 68°52′30″E
- Country: Tajikistan
- Region: Sughd Region
- District: Shahriston District

Chashmasor (Tajik: Чашмасор) is a village in Sughd Region, northern Tajikistan. It is part of the jamoat Shahriston in Shahriston District.
