= Vahdat, Shahriston District =

Vahdat
- Location in Tajikistan
- Coordinates: 39°47′13″N 68°51′00″E
- Country: Tajikistan
- Region: Sughd Region
- District: Shahriston District
- Official languages: Russian (Interethnic); Tajik (State)

Vahdat (Russian: Вахдат; Tajik: Ваҳдат, formerly Kaerma) is a village in Sughd Region, northern Tajikistan. It is part of the jamoat Shahriston in Shahriston District.
