= Gerdab-e Saqaveh =

Gerdab-e Saqaveh گرداب سقاوه
- Village
- Country: Iran
- Province: Kohgiluyeh and Boyer-Ahmad
- County: Boyer-Ahmad
- Bakhsh: Margown
- Rural District: Margown

Population (2006)
  - Total: 21
- Time zone: UTC+3:30 (IRST)
  - Summer (DST): UTC+4:30 (IRDT)

Gerdab-e Saqaveh (Persian: گرداب سقاوه, also Romanized as Gerdāb-e Saqāveh) is a village in Margown Rural District, Margown District, Boyer-Ahmad County, Kohgiluyeh and Boyer-Ahmad Province, Iran. At the 2006 census, its population was 21, in 4 families.
