= Gerdab-e Piazi =

Gerdab-e Piazi گرداب پيازي
- Village
- Location within Iran
- Coordinates: 29°55′58″N 51°05′49″E
- Country: Iran
- Province: Fars
- County: Mamasani
- Bakhsh: Mahvarmilani
- Rural District: Mishan

Population (2006)
  - Total: 70
- Time zone: UTC+3:30 (IRST)
  - Summer (DST): UTC+4:30 (IRDT)

Gerdab-e Piazi (Persian: گرداب پيازي, also Romanized as Gerdāb-e Pīāzī; also known as Khorshevā, Par-e Ja‘far, and Par-i-Ja‘far) is a village in Mishan Rural District, Mahvarmilani District, Mamasani County, Fars province, Iran. At the 2006 census, its population was 70, in 13 families.
