= Kalavi, Hormozgan =

Kalavi كلاوي
- Village
- Location within Iran
- Coordinates: 26°51′44″N 57°03′57″E
- Country: Iran
- Province: Hormozgan
- County: Minab
- Bakhsh: Byaban
- Rural District: Bemani

Population (2006)
  - Total: 409
- Time zone: UTC+3:30 (IRST)
  - Summer (DST): UTC+4:30 (IRDT)

Kalavi (Persian: كلاوي, also Romanized as Kalāvī; also known as Golābī and Kalābī) is a village in Bemani Rural District, Byaban District, Minab County, Hormozgan Province, Iran. At the 2006 census, its population was 409, in 69 families.
