= Ab Gavan-e Bozorg =

Ab Gavan-e Bozorg ابگاون بزرگ
- Village
- Location within Iran
- Coordinates: 31°05′05″N 50°29′48″E
- Country: Iran
- Province: Kohgiluyeh and Boyer-Ahmad
- County: Kohgiluyeh
- Bakhsh: Charusa
- Rural District: Tayebi-ye Sarhadi-ye Sharqi

Population (2006)
  - Total: 101
- Time zone: UTC+3:30 (IRST)
  - Summer (DST): UTC+4:30 (IRDT)

Ab Gavan-e Bozorg (Persian: ابگاون بزرگ, also Romanized as Āb Gāvān-e Bozorg) is a village in Tayebi-ye Sarhadi-ye Sharqi Rural District, Charusa District, Kohgiluyeh County, Kohgiluyeh and Boyer-Ahmad Province, Iran. According to the 2006 census, it had a population of 101 in 17 families.
