= Parvaz, Afghanistan =

Parvaz
- Location in Afghanistan
- Coordinates: 36°32′30″N 67°17′38″E
- Country: Afghanistan
- Province: Balkh Province
- Time zone: + 4.30

Parvaz is a village in Balkh Province in northern Afghanistan.

== See also ==
- Balkh Province
