= Tall-e Quchan, Khuzestan =

Tall-e Quchan تل قوچان
- Village
- Location within Iran
- Coordinates: 31°49′00″N 49°18′00″E
- Country: Iran
- Province: Khuzestan
- County: Masjed Soleyman
- Bakhsh: Golgir
- Rural District: Tolbozan

Population (2006)
  - Total: 49
- Time zone: UTC+3:30 (IRST)
  - Summer (DST): UTC+4:30 (IRDT)

Tall-e Quchan (Persian: تل قوچان, also Romanized as Tall-e Qūchān; also known as Tel-i-Guchān) is a village in Tolbozan Rural District, Golgir District, Masjed Soleyman County, Khuzestan Province, Iran. At the 2006 census, its population was 49, in 9 families.
