= Shahriar Rural District (Falard County) =

Rural district in Chaharmahal and Bakhtiari province, Iran

Shahriar Rural District Persian: دهستان شهريار
- Rural District
- Location within Iran
- Coordinates: 31°22′N 51°14′E
- Country: Iran
- Province: Chaharmahal and Bakhtiari
- County: Falard
- District: Central
- Established: 2022
- Capital: Shahriar
- Time zone: UTC+3:30 (IRST)

Shahriar Rural District (Persian: دهستان شهريار) is in the Central District (Note: Formerly Falard District of Lordegan County) of Falard County, Chaharmahal and Bakhtiari province, Iran. Its capital is the village of Shahriar, whose population at the time of the 2016 National Census was 2,076 in 614 households.

== History ==
In 2022, Falard District (Note: Renamed the Central District of Falard County) was separated from Lordegan County in the establishment of Falard County and renamed the Central District. Shahriar Rural District was created in the district.

== Other villages in the rural district ==
- Chahar Deh
- Kondar
