= Amiran Khuskivadze =

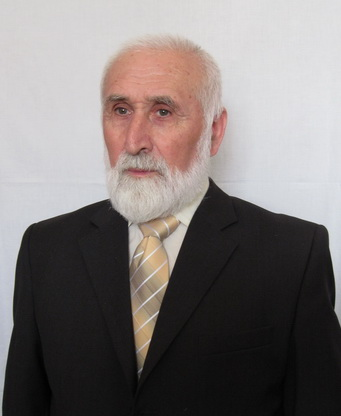

Amiran Pimenovich Khuskivadze (born 5 May 1933) is a physicist, cyberneticist, philosopher, creator of the Theory of Integrity, and author of two laws of nature's harmony: The Law of the Integral System Existence and The Law of Intrasystem Harmony.

== Early life ==
A.P. Khuskivadze's father was Pimen Vladimirovich Khuskivadze (1903–1937), a participant of collectivization in Georgia; his mother was Alexandra (Shura) Ilinichna Tskhadadze (1913–2000), a housewife.

In 1957, he graduated from the Faculty of Physics at Tbilisi State University.

In 1967–1970, he was a post-graduate student of the faculty and prepared a dissertation entitled “A Study on the Efficiency of Large Systems” for a PhD with a dual major in Physics and Mathematics, specializing in Theoretical Cybernetics.

== Career ==
In 1962, A.P. Khuskivadze began to study large (complex) systems. In 1970, he worked in the field of medical cybernetics and was head of the "Laboratory of Automated Management Systems of Medical Cybernetics Department at the Research Institute of Experimental and Clinical Surgery of the Ministry of Health of the Georgian SSR".

After the transformation of the Medical Cybernetics Department into the Central Research Laboratory of the Ministry of Health of the Georgian SSR, he became the head of the Sector of System Studies of the Laboratory. In 1985–1997, A.P. Khuskivadze worked at the Research Institute of Experimental and Clinical Therapy of the Ministry of Health of Georgian SSR as head of the Medical System Engineering Laboratory. In 1977, A.P. Khuskivadze permanently relocated to Russia.

From 1980 to 1985, A.P. Khuskivadze was a member of the Scientific Council for System Analysis in Medicine of the Committee for System Analysis of the USSR Academy of Sciences. In 1984–1985, he was also a member of the Task Group on System Analysis in Medicine and Biology of the Scientific Council "Medical and biological cybernetics" of the USSR Academy of Medical Sciences.

He is the author of more than 90 scientific publications.

== Personal life ==
In 1961, A.P. Khuskivadze married Rosa Ivanovna Khuskivadze (maiden name Goloveshkina). They had two sons, Pimen (1962) and Amiran (1975–2004).

== Monographs ==
=== Published manuscripts ===
- Theory of Integrity. Decision making in large (complex) systems. Saarbruken, Deutschland, Lambert Academic Publishing, 2014. 304 pp. ISBN 978-3-659-52793-7
  - Теория целостности. Принятие решения в больших – сложных – cистемах (Автор) – Saarbruken, - Deutschland, – Lambert Academic Publishing, – 2014. – 304 с. – ISBN 978-3-659-52793-7
- Theory of Integrity. Decision making in large (complex) systems. Second edition, revised and updated, 2015. 315 pp. ISBN 978-3-659-52793-7.
  - Теория целостности. Принятие решения в больших - сложных – системах. Второе – переработанное и дополненное - издание. (Автор). – 2015. – 315 с. – ISBN 978-3-659-52793-7.
- World order. Medlinks.ru (Medical library). Fundamental medicine. Books and manuals, 2010. 110 pp.
  - Мироустройство (Автор). - Medlinks.ru - Медицинская библиотека. – Фундаментальная медицина. - Книги и руководства. – 2010. – 110 с. http://www.medlinks.ru/sections.php?op=listarticles&secid=108
- A revised version of the book can be found at: https://web.archive.org/web/20130317222725/http://www.synergetic.ru/books/miroustroystvo.html
- Problems of multicriteria optimization and evaluation in empirical integral systems and their solutions. Tbilisi, Sakartvelo, 1991. 120 pp.
  - Задачи многокритериальной оптимизации и оценивания в эмпирических целостных системах и их решения (Автор). – Тбилиси, - Сакартвело, - 1991. – 120 с.
- Integral systems. Issues of the general theory of management systems. Tbilisi, Sabchota Sakartvelo, 1979. 316 pp.
  - Целостные системы: Вопросы общей теории систем управления (Автор). - Тбилиси, - Сабчота Сакартвело, - 1979.– 316 с.

=== Deposited manuscripts ===
- Decision making in large (complex) systems. Moscow, RAO COPYRUS, 2017. 120 pp. ISBN 978-5-4472-6359-1
  - Принятие решения в больших – сложных – системах» (Автор). - М.: - РАО КОПИРУС. -2017. – 120 с. - ISBN 978-5-4472-6359-1
- Theory of Integrity. Decision making in large (complex) systems. Third edition, revised and updated. Moscow, RAO COPYRUS, 2017. 350 pp. ISBN 978-5-4472-6195-5
  - Теория целостности. Принятие решения в больших – сложных – системах. Третье – уточненное и дополненное – издание. (Автор). - М.: - РАО КОПИРУС. - 2017. – 350 с. - ISBN 978-5-4472-6195-5
