= Gardab-e Do =

Gardab-e Do گرداب دو
- Village
- Location within Iran
- Coordinates: 32°51′00″N 48°15′00″E
- Country: Iran
- Province: Khuzestan
- County: Andimeshk
- Bakhsh: Alvar-e Garmsiri
- Rural District: Qilab

Population (2006)
  - Total: 76
- Time zone: UTC+3:30 (IRST)
  - Summer (DST): UTC+4:30 (IRDT)

Gardab-e Do (Persian: گرداب دو, also Romanized as Gardāb-e Do) is a village in Qilab Rural District, Alvar-e Garmsiri District, Andimeshk County, Khuzestan Province, Iran. At the 2006 census, its population was 76, in 18 families.
