= Vahdat, Kermanshah =

Vahdat وحدت
- Village
- Location within Iran
- Coordinates: 34°11′24″N 46°38′03″E
- Country: Iran
- Province: Kermanshah
- County: Eslamabad-e Gharb
- Bakhsh: Central
- Rural District: Hasanabad

Population (2006)
  - Total: 539
- Time zone: UTC+3:30 (IRST)
  - Summer (DST): UTC+4:30 (IRDT)

Vahdat (Persian: وحدت, also Romanized as Vaḥdat) is a village in Hasanabad Rural District, in the Central District of Eslamabad-e Gharb County, Kermanshah Province, Iran. At the 2006 census, its population was 539 citizens or 111 households.
