= Gerdab, Isfahan =

Gerdab گرداب
- Village
- Location within Iran
- Coordinates: 32°35′19″N 50°17′50″E
- Country: Iran
- Province: Isfahan
- County: Chadegan
- Bakhsh: Chenarud
- Rural District: Chenarud-e Jonubi

Population (2006)
  - Total: 28
- Time zone: UTC+3:30 (IRST)
  - Summer (DST): UTC+4:30 (IRDT)

Gerdab (Persian: گرداب, also Romanized as Gerdāb) is a village in Chenarud-e Jonubi Rural District, Chenarud District, Chadegan County, Isfahan Province, Iran. At the 2006 census, its population was 28, in 5 families.
