= Mal-e Khalifeh =

City in Chaharmahal and Bakhtiari province, Iran

Mal-e Khalifeh Persian: مال خليفه
- City
- Location within Iran
- Coordinates: 31°17′27″N 51°15′37″E
- Country: Iran
- Province: Chaharmahal and Bakhtiari
- County: Falard
- District: Central

Population (2016)
  - Total: 4,024
- Time zone: UTC+3:30 (IRST)

Mal-e Khalifeh (Persian: مال خليفه) (Note: Also romanized as Māl Khalīfeh and Māl-e Khalīfeh; also known as Deh Khalīfa and Deh-e Khalīfeh) is a city in the Central District (Note: Formerly Falard District of Lordegan County) of Falard County, Chaharmahal and Bakhtiari province, Iran, serving as capital of both the county and the district. It was the administrative center for Falard Rural District until its capital was transferred to the village of Kalvari-ye Sofla.

== Demographics ==
=== Ethnicity ===
The city is populated by Lurs.

=== Population ===
At the time of the 2006 National Census, the city's population was 2,962 in 658 households, when it was in Falard District (Note: Renamed the Central District of Falard County) of Lordegan County. The following census in 2011 counted 3,698 people in 857 households. The 2016 census measured the population of the city as 4,024 people in 1,228 households.

In 2022, the district was separated from the county in the establishment of Falard County and renamed the Central District. Mal-e Khalifeh became the capital of the new county.
