= Gardab-e Yek =

Gardab-e Yek گرداب یک
- Village
- Location within Iran
- Coordinates: 32°51′06″N 48°15′44″E
- Country: Iran
- Province: Khuzestan
- County: Andimeshk
- Bakhsh: Alvar-e Garmsiri
- Rural District: Qilab

Population (2006)
  - Total: 19
- Time zone: UTC+3:30 (IRST)
  - Summer (DST): UTC+4:30 (IRDT)

Gardab-e Yek (Persian: گرداب یک, also Romanized as Gardāb-e Yek; also known as Gardāb and Gerdāb) is a village in Qilab Rural District, Alvar-e Garmsiri District, Andimeshk County, Khuzestan Province, Iran. At the 2006 census, its population was 19, in 5 families.
