= Poshtkuh Rural District (Falard County) =

Rural district in Chaharmahal and Bakhtiari province, Iran

Poshtkuh Rural District Persian: دهستان پشتكوه
- Rural District
- Location within Iran
- Coordinates: 31°17′N 51°10′E
- Country: Iran
- Province: Chaharmahal and Bakhtiari
- County: Falard
- District: Emamzadeh Hasan
- Established: 1990
- Capital: Darreh Namdari

Population (2016)
  - Total: 9,081
- Time zone: UTC+3:30 (IRST)

Poshtkuh Rural District (Persian: دهستان پشتكوه) is in Emamzadeh Hasan District of Falard County, Chaharmahal and Bakhtiari province, Iran. Its capital is the village of Darreh Namdari. The previous capital of the rural district was the village of Qaleh Sukhteh.

== Demographics ==
=== Population ===
At the time of the 2006 National Census, the rural district's population (as a part of Falard District (Note: Renamed the Central District of Falard County) in Lordegan County) was 8,569 in 1,783 households. There were 9,575 inhabitants in 2,262 households at the following census of 2011. The 2016 census measured the population of the rural district as 9,081 in 2,468 households. The most populous of its 34 villages was Shah Najaf, with 1,131 people.

=== Other villages in the rural district ===
- Dam Ab
- Safidar

In 2022, the district was separated from the county in the establishment of Falard County and renamed the Central District. The rural district was transferred to the new Emamzadeh Hasan District.
