= Emamzadeh Hasan District =

District in Chaharmahal and Bakhtiari province, Iran

Emamzadeh Hasan District Persian: بخش امامزاده حسن
- District
- Location within Iran
- Coordinates: 31°15′N 51°08′E
- Country: Iran
- Province: Chaharmahal and Bakhtiari
- County: Falard
- Established: 2022
- Capital: Shah Najaf
- Time zone: UTC+3:30 (IRST)

Emamzadeh Hasan District (Persian: بخش امامزاده حسن) is in Falard County, Chaharmahal and Bakhtiari province, Iran. Its capital is the village of Shah Najaf, whose population at the time of the 2016 National Census was 1,131 people in 307 households.

== History ==
In 2022, Falard District (Note: Renamed the Central District of Falard County) was separated from Lordegan County in the establishment of Falard County and renamed the Central District. The new county was divided into two districts of two rural districts each, with Mal-e Khalifeh as its capital and only city at the time.

== Demographics ==
=== Administrative divisions ===
Emamzadeh Hasan District
Administrative Divisions
Parvaz RD
Poshtkuh RD
RD = Rural District
