= Shahristan District, Tajikistan =

Shahristan District Persian: ناحیه شهرستان Tajik: ноҳияи Шаҳристон
- District
- Location of Shahriston District in Tajikistan
- Coordinates: 39°42′N 68°45′E
- Country: Tajikistan
- Region: Sughd Region
- Capital: Shahristan

Area
  - Total: 1,100 km^{2} (420 sq mi)

Population (2020)
  - Total: 43,700
  - Density: 40/km^{2} (100/sq mi)
- Time zone: UTC+5 (TJT)
- Official languages: Russian (Interethnic); Tajik (State)

Shahristan District (Tajik: ноҳияи Шаҳристон; Persian: ناحیه شهرستان, Nohiyai Shahriston) is a district in Sughd Region, Tajikistan. Its capital is Shahristan. The population of the district is 43,700 (January 2020 estimate).

== Administrative divisions ==
The district has an area of about 1,100 km^{2} (400 sq mi) and is divided administratively into two jamoats. They are as follows:

Jamoat	Population (Jan. 2015)
Bunjikat	15,344
Shahriston	22,903

== Artefact ==
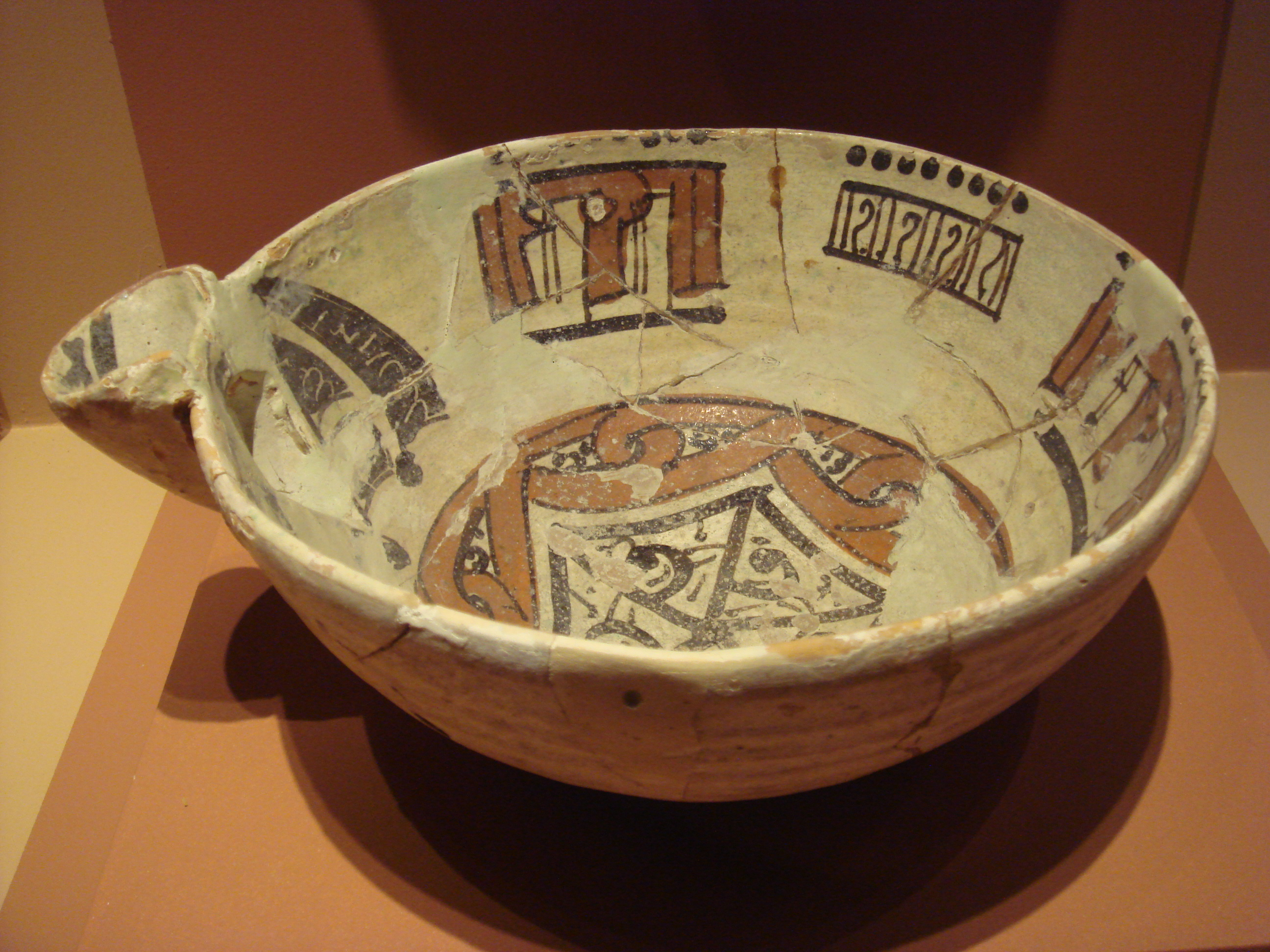
Bowl from Shahristan, Tajikistan, 9-11th century, National Museum of Antiquities of Tajikistan (113-218)

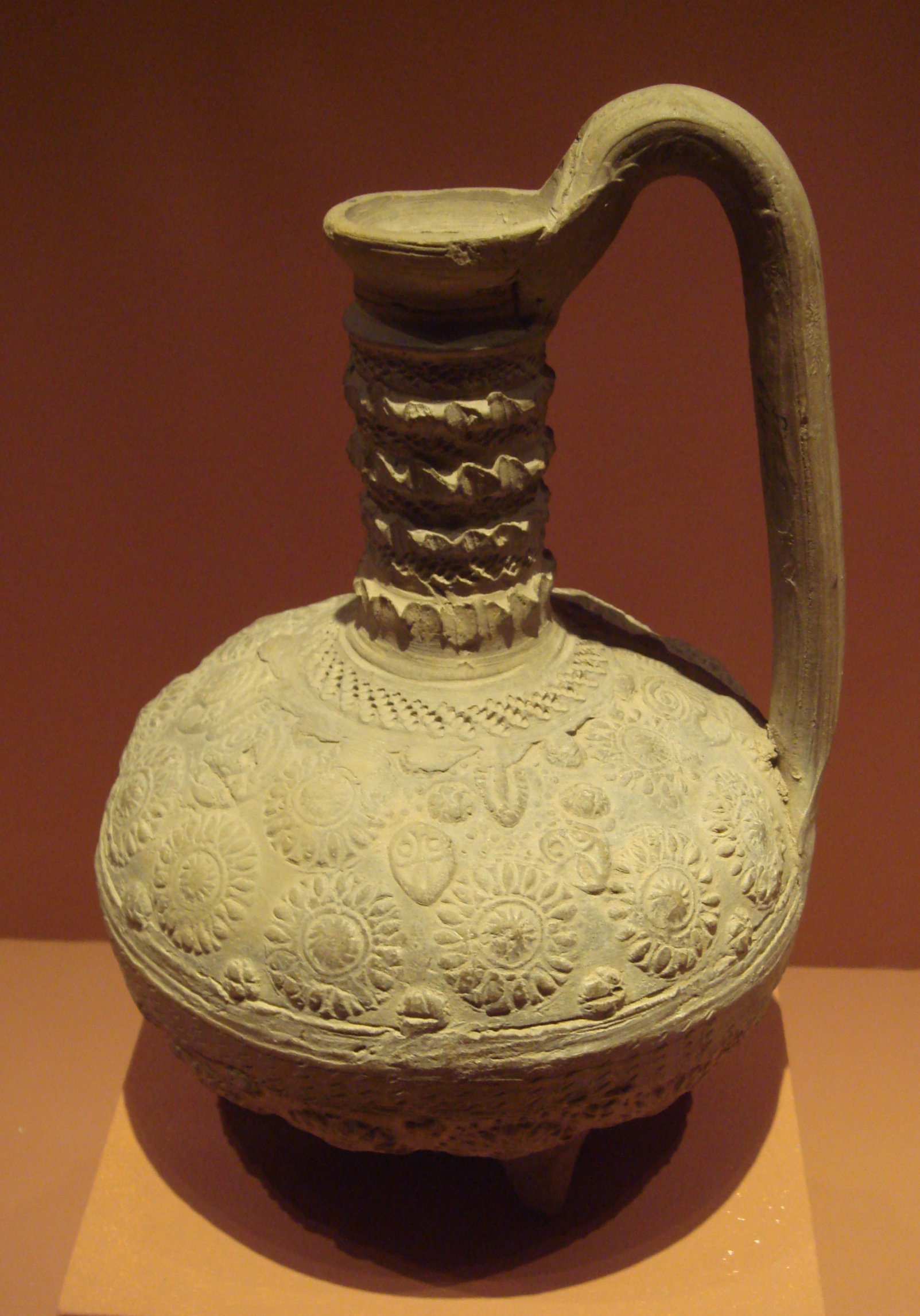
Ewer from Shahristan, Tajikistan, 9-11th century, National Museum of Tajikistan (KV 13752)
