= Falard Rural District =

Rural district in Chaharmahal and Bakhtiari province, Iran

Falard Rural District Persian: دهستان فلارد
- Rural District
- Location within Iran
- Coordinates: 31°16′N 51°16′E
- Country: Iran
- Province: Chaharmahal and Bakhtiari
- County: Falard
- District: Central
- Established: 1987
- Capital: Kalvari-ye Sofla

Population (2016)
  - Total: 19,918
- Time zone: UTC+3:30 (IRST)

Falard Rural District (Persian: دهستان فلارد) is in the Central District (Note: Formerly Falard District of Lordegan County) of Falard County, Chaharmahal and Bakhtiari province, Iran. Its capital is the village of Kalvari-ye Sofla. The rural district was previously administered from the city of Mal-e Khalifeh.

== Demographics ==
=== Population ===
At the time of the 2006 National Census, the rural district's population (as a part of Falard District (Note: Renamed the Central District of Falard County) in Lordegan County) was 18,723 in 3,816 households. There were 19,671 inhabitants in 4,914 households at the following census of 2011. The 2016 census measured the population of the rural district as 19,918 in 5,589 households. The most populous of its 34 villages was Shahriar (now in Shahriar Rural District), with 2,076 people.

In 2022, the district was separated from the county in the establishment of Falard County and renamed the Central District.

=== Other villages in the rural district ===
- Abu Eshaq-e Olya
- Qarah
- Sahlabad
- Sandejan-e Olya
- Sandejan-e Sofla
- Shahrak-e Emam Khomeyni
- Yunaki
