= Vahdat Rural District (Landeh County) =

Rural district in Kohgiluyeh and Boyer-Ahmad province, Iran

Vahdat Rural District Persian: دهستان وحدت
- Rural District
- Location within Iran
- Coordinates: 31°02′28″N 50°27′47″E
- Country: Iran
- Province: Kohgiluyeh and Boyer-Ahmad
- County: Landeh
- District: Mugarmun
- Capital: Vahdatabad-e Mugarmun

Population (2016)
  - Total: 864
- Time zone: UTC+3:30 (IRST)

Vahdat Rural District (Persian: دهستان وحدت) is in Mugarmun District of Landeh County, Kohgiluyeh and Boyer-Ahmad province, Iran. Its capital is the village of Vahdatabad-e Mugarmun.

== History ==
In 2013, Landeh District was separated from Kohgiluyeh County in the establishment of Landeh County, and Vahdat Rural District was created in the new Mugarmun District.

== Demographics ==
=== Population ===
At the time of the 2016 National Census, the rural district's population was 864 in 220 households. The most populous of its 26 villages was Bonah Aliyari, with 187 people.
