= Mugarmun District =

District in Kohgiluyeh and Boyer-Ahmad province, Iran

Mugarmun District Persian: بخش موگرمون
- District
- Location within Iran
- Coordinates: 31°01′29″N 50°24′36″E
- Country: Iran
- Province: Kohgiluyeh and Boyer-Ahmad
- County: Landeh
- Capital: Shitab

Population (2016)
  - Total: 2,861
- Time zone: UTC+3:30 (IRST)

Mugarmun District (Persian: بخش موگرمون) is in Landeh County, Kohgiluyeh and Boyer-Ahmad province, Iran. Its capital is the village of Shitab.

== History ==
In 2013, Landeh District was separated from Kohgiluyeh County in the establishment of Landeh County, which was divided into two districts of two rural districts each, with Landeh as its capital and only city.

== Demographics ==
=== Population ===
At the time of the 2016 National Census, the district's population was 2,861 inhabitants in 709 households.

=== Administrative divisions ===
Mugarmun District Population
Administrative Divisions	2016
Shitab RD	1,997
Vahdat RD	864
Total	2,861
RD = Rural District
