= Falard County =

County in Chaharmahal and Bakhtiari province, Iran

Falard County Persian: شهرستان فلارد
- County
- Location of Falard County in Chaharmahal and Bakhtiari province (bottom, yellow)

- Location of Chaharmahal and Bakhtiari province in Iran
- Coordinates: 31°17′N 51°11′E
- Country: Iran
- Province: Chaharmahal and Bakhtiari
- Established: 2022
- Capital: Mal-e Khalifeh
- District: Central, Emamzadeh Hasan
- Time zone: UTC+3:30 (IRST)

Falard County (Persian: شهرستان فلارد) is in Chaharmahal and Bakhtiari province, Iran. Its capital is the city of Mal-e Khalifeh, whose population at the time of the 2016 National Census was 4,024 people in 1,228 households.

== History ==
In 2022, Falard District (Note: Renamed the Central District of Falard County) was separated from Lordegan County in the establishment of Falard County and renamed the Central District. The new county was divided into two districts of two rural districts each, with Mal-e Khalifeh as its capital and only city at the time.

== Demographics ==
=== Administrative divisions ===
Falard County's administrative structure is shown in the following table.

Falard County
Administrative Divisions
Central District (Note: Formerly Falard District of Lordegan County)
Falard RD
Shahriar RD
Mal-e Khalifeh (city)
Emamzadeh Hasan District
Parvaz RD
Poshtkuh RD
RD = Rural District

== See also ==
Media related to Falard County at Wikimedia Commons
