= Central District (Falard County) =

District in Chaharmahal and Bakhtiari province, Iran

Central District (Falard County) Persian: بخش مرکزی شهرستان فلارد
- District
- Location within Iran
- Coordinates: 31°18′N 51°14′E
- Country: Iran
- Province: Chaharmahal and Bakhtiari
- County: Falard
- Capital: Mal-e Khalifeh

Population (2016)
  - Total: 33,023 (Note: As Falard District of Lordegan County)
- Time zone: UTC+3:30 (IRST)

The Central District of Falard County (Persian: بخش مرکزی شهرستان فلارد) (Note: Formerly Falard District (بخش فلارد) of Lordegan County) is in Falard County, Chaharmahal and Bakhtiari province, Iran. Its capital is the city of Mal-e Khalifeh.

== History ==
In 2022, Falard District (Note: Renamed the Central District of Falard County) was separated from Lordegan County in the establishment of Falard County and renamed the Central District. The new county was divided into two districts of two rural districts each, with Mal-e Khalifeh as its capital and only city at the time.

== Demographics ==
=== Population ===
At the time of the 2006 National Census, the district's population (as Falard District of Lordegan County) was 30,254 in 6,257 households. The following census in 2011 counted 32,944 people in 8,033 households. The 2016 census measured the population of the district as 33,023 inhabitants living in 9,285 households.

=== Administrative divisions ===
Central District (Falard County) (Note: As Falard District of Lordegan County at the 2006, 2011, and 2016 censuses)
Administrative Divisions	2006	2011	2016
Falard RD	18,723	19,671	19,918
Poshtkuh RD (Note: Transferred to Emamzadeh Hasan District after the 2016 census)	8,569	9,575	9,081
Shahriar RD (Note: Established after the 2016 census)			
Mal-e Khalifeh (city)	2,962	3,698	4,024
Total	30,254	32,944	33,023
RD = Rural District
