= Algi =

Algi may refer to:

- Algi, Barisal, Bangladesh
- Algi, Chittagong, Bangladesh
- Algi, Iran, in Khuzestan Province, Iran
- Algi-ye Olya, in Chaharmahal and Bakhtiari Province, Iran
- Algi-ye Sofla, in Chaharmahal and Bakhtiari Province, Iran
