= Bazoft =

Bazoft (Persian: بازفت) may refer to:

- Bazoft District, a district in Chaharmahal and Bakhtiari province, Iran
  - Bazoft (city), capital city of the district
  - Bazoft Rural District, a rural district within the district
- Farzad Bazoft (1958–1990), Iranian journalist
