= Mian Dowhan =

Mian Dowhan (Persian: ميان دوهان), also rendered as Mian Dahan or Meyan Dehan, may refer to:

- Mian Dowhan-e Olya
- Mian Dowhan-e Sofla
