= Telurd =

Neighborhood in Chaharmahal and Bakhtiari province, Iran

Telurd Persian: تلورد
- Neighborhood
- Location within Iran
- Coordinates: 32°12′14″N 50°02′43″E
- Country: Iran
- Province: Chaharmahal and Bakhtiari
- County: Kuhrang
- District: Bazoft
- City: Bazoft

Population (2011)
  - Total: 1,064
- Time zone: UTC+3:30 (IRST)

Telurd (Persian: تلورد) is a neighborhood in the city of Bazoft in Bazoft District of Kuhrang County, Chaharmahal and Bakhtiari province, Iran.

== Demographics ==
=== Population ===
At the time of the 2006 National Census, Telurd's population was 499 in 91 households, when it was a village in Bazoft Rural District. (Note: Renamed Bazoft-e Pain Rural District) The following census in 2011 counted 1,064 people in 79 households.

The village of Chaman Goli was merged with the village of Telurd in the formation of the city of Bazoft in 2013.
