= Shahrak-e Kushka =

Village in Chaharmahal and Bakhtiari province, Iran

Shahrak-e Kushka Persian: شهرك كوشكا
- Village
- Location within Iran
- Coordinates: 32°23′32″N 49°51′00″E
- Country: Iran
- Province: Chaharmahal and Bakhtiari
- County: Kuhrang
- District: Bazoft
- Rural District: Bazoft-e Bala

Population (2016)
  - Total: 528
- Time zone: UTC+3:30 (IRST)

Shahrak-e Kushka (Persian: شهرك كوشكا) (Note: Also romanized as Shahrak-e Kūshkā; also known as Kūshk and Kushka) is a village in Bazoft-e Bala Rural District of Bazoft District in Kuhrang County, Chaharmahal and Bakhtiari province, Iran.

== Demographics ==
=== Ethnicity ===
The village is populated by Lurs.

=== Population ===
At the time of the 2006 National Census, the village's population was 282 in 43 households, when it was a village in Bazoft Rural District. (Note: Renamed Bazoft-e Pain Rural District) The following census in 2011 counted 418 people in 86 households. The 2016 census measured the population of the village as 528 people in 130 households, by which time it had been transferred to Bazoft-e Bala Rural District created in the same district. It was the most populous village in its rural district.
