= Shahrak-e Mazeh Sukhteh =

Village in Chaharmahal and Bakhtiari province, Iran

Shahrak-e Mazeh Sukhteh Persian: شهرك مازه سوخته
- Village
- Location within Iran
- Coordinates: 32°27′47″N 49°51′12″E
- Country: Iran
- Province: Chaharmahal and Bakhtiari
- County: Kuhrang
- District: Bazoft
- Rural District: Bazoft-e Bala

Population (2016)
  - Total: 283
- Time zone: UTC+3:30 (IRST)

Shahrak-e Mazeh Sukhteh (Persian: شهرك مازه سوخته) (Note: Also romanized as Shahrak-e Māzeh Sūkhteh) is a village in Bazoft-e Bala Rural District of Bazoft District in Kuhrang County, Chaharmahal and Bakhtiari province, Iran.

== Demographics ==
=== Ethnicity ===
The village is populated by Lurs.

=== Population ===
At the time of the 2006 National Census, the village's population was 201 in 41 households, when it was a village in Bazoft Rural District. (Note: Renamed Bazoft-e Pain Rural District) The following census in 2011 counted 159 people in 29 households. The 2016 census measured the population of the village as 283 people in 55 households, by which time it had been transferred to Bazoft-e Bala Rural District created in the district.
