= Lebd =

Lebd (Persian: لبد) may refer to:

- Lebd-e Olya
- Lebd-e Sofla
