= Tepa =

Tepa may refer to:

- Stinkheads, fermented whitefish heads, a traditional food of the Yup'ik peoples in southwest Alaska
- Tepa, Ghana, a town in Ghana
- Tepa-ye Olya, a village in Iran
- Tepa-ye Sofla, a village in Iran
- Tepa, the administrative centre of Babar Islands, Maluku Province, Indonesia
- Ţepa, a village in Paltin Commune, Vrancea County, Romania
- A tree, Laureliopsis philippiana, native to Chile and Argentina
- Uch Tepa, a city district of Tashkent, Uzbekistan
- Tepa (bug), a shield bug genus in the tribe Pentatomini
- Tetraethylenepentamine, a chemical compound
- N,N′,N′′-triethylenephosphoramide, a metabolite of thiotepa
