= Tabarak =

Tabarak (Persian: تبرك) may refer to:

== Places ==
- Tabarak-e Olya
- Tabarak-e Sofla

== People ==
- Tabarak Dar (born 1976), a Pakistani-born international cricketer
- Tabarak Husain (1924–2018), a Bangladeshi diplomat
