= Dehnash =

Village in Chaharmahal and Bakhtiari province, Iran

Dehnash Persian: دهناش
- Village
- Location within Iran
- Coordinates: 32°19′33″N 49°57′51″E
- Country: Iran
- Province: Chaharmahal and Bakhtiari
- County: Kuhrang
- District: Bazoft
- Rural District: Bazoft-e Bala

Population (2016)
  - Total: 193
- Time zone: UTC+3:30 (IRST)

Dehnash (Persian: دهناش) (Note: Also romanized as Dehnāsh) is a village in, and the capital of, Bazoft-e Bala Rural District in Bazoft District of Kuhrang County, Chaharmahal and Bakhtiari province, Iran. Dehnash was the capital of Bazoft Rural District (Note: Renamed Bazoft-e Pain Rural District) until its capital was transferred to the village of Chaman Goli.

== Demographics ==
=== Ethnicity ===
The village is populated by Bakhtiari people.

=== Population ===
At the time of the 2006 National Census, the village's population was 218 in 38 households, when it was a village in Bazoft Rural District. The following census in 2011 counted 180 people in 41 households. The 2016 census measured the population of the village as 193 people in 53 households, by which time it had been transferred to Bazoft-e Bala Rural District created in the same district.
