= Karkon =

Karkon (Persian: كاركن) may refer to:

- Karkon-e Olya
- Karkon-e Sofla
