= Mian Dowhan-e Sofla =

Mian Dowhan-e Sofla مياندوهان سفلي
- village
- Location within Iran
- Coordinates: 32°12′03″N 50°05′12″E
- Country: Iran
- Province: Chaharmahal and Bakhtiari
- County: Kuhrang
- Bakhsh: Bazoft
- Rural District: Bazoft

Population (2006)
  - Total: 94
- Time zone: UTC+3:30 (IRST)
  - Summer (DST): UTC+4:30 (IRDT)

Mian Dowhan-e Sofla (Persian: مياندوهان سفلي, also Romanized as Mīān Dowhān-e Soflá; also known as Mīān Dahān-e Soflá) is a village in Bazoft Rural District, Bazoft District, Kuhrang County, Chaharmahal and Bakhtiari Province, Iran. At the 2006 census, its population was 94, in 22 families. The village is populated by Lurs.
