= Lebd-e Olya =

Lebd-e Olya لبدعليا
- Village
- Location within Iran
- Coordinates: 32°38′32″N 49°35′46″E
- Country: Iran
- Province: Chaharmahal and Bakhtiari
- County: Kuhrang
- Bakhsh: Bazoft
- Rural District: Bazoft

Population (2006)
  - Total: 125
- Time zone: UTC+3:30 (IRST)
  - Summer (DST): UTC+4:30 (IRDT)

Lebd-e Olya (Persian: لبدعليا, also Romanized as Lebd-e ‘Olyā) is a village in Bazoft Rural District, Bazoft District, Kuhrang County, Chaharmahal and Bakhtiari Province, Iran. At the 2006 census, its population was 125, in 21 families. The village is populated by Lurs.
