= Tepa-ye Olya =

Tepa-ye Olya تپاعليا
- Village
- Location within Iran
- Coordinates: 32°18′00″N 49°58′30″E
- Country: Iran
- Province: Chaharmahal and Bakhtiari
- County: Kuhrang
- Bakhsh: Bazoft
- Rural District: Bazoft

Population (2006)
  - Total: 41
- Time zone: UTC+3:30 (IRST)
  - Summer (DST): UTC+4:30 (IRDT)

Tepa-ye Olya (Persian: تپاعليا, also Romanized as Tepā-ye ‘Olyā; also known as Tīā-ye ‘Olyā) is a village in Bazoft Rural District, Bazoft District, Kuhrang County, Chaharmahal and Bakhtiari Province, Iran. At the 2006 census, its population was 41, in 7 families. The village is populated by Lurs.
