= Cham Qaleh =

Cham Qaleh (Persian: چم قلعه may refer to:

- Chamkhaleh, Gilan Province
- Chaf and Chamkhaleh, Gilan Province
- Cham Qaleh, Chaharmahal and Bakhtiari
- Cham Qaleh, Kuhdasht, Lorestan Province
- Cham Qaleh, Pol-e Dokhtar, Lorestan Province
