= Arteh =

Village in Chaharmahal and Bakhtiari province, Iran

Arteh Persian: ارته
- Village
- Location within Iran
- Coordinates: 32°13′38″N 49°59′45″E
- Country: Iran
- Province: Chaharmahal and Bakhtiari
- County: Kuhrang
- District: Bazoft
- Rural District: Bazoft-e Pain

Population (2016)
  - Total: 817
- Time zone: UTC+3:30 (IRST)

Arteh (Persian: ارته) is a village in Bazoft-e Pain Rural District (Note: Formerly Bazoft Rural District) of Bazoft District in Kuhrang County, Chaharmahal and Bakhtiari province, Iran.

== Demographics ==
=== Ethnicity ===
The village is populated by Lurs.

=== Population ===
At the time of the 2006 National Census, the village's population was 641 in 104 households. The following census in 2011 counted 871 people in 172 households. The 2016 census measured the population of the village as 817 people in 168 households.
