= Tavard =

Tavard may refer to:

- Georges Tavard (1922-2007), American theologian
- Tavard, Iran, a village in Chaharmahal and Bakhtiari Province, Iran
