= Cheltenham & Gloucester Building Society v Norgan =

- Court: Court of Appeal
- Decided: 5 December 1995
- Citations: [1995] EWCA Civ 11 [1996] 1 WLR 343

Case history
- Prior action: On appeal from an appeal of the Administrative Court: HHJ O'Malley sitting in the Shaftesbury County Court

Court membership
- Judges sitting: Waite LJ; Sir John May LJ; Evans LJ

Keywords
- Mortgage

Cheltenham & Gloucester Building Society v Norgan [1996] 1 WLR 343 is an English land law case, concerning mortgage arrears.

Under section 36 Administration of Justice Act 1970 (as amended), the lender should, for an owner-occupier mortgage borrower facing temporary income difficulties set a clearly sustainable payment plan based on good evidence assessed such as, if proportionate to its own expected interests, to pay off the arrears over all of the remaining term of the mortgage rather than necessarily the shortest payment plan possible. This will spare the high cost and inconvenience to the borrower of the lender's repeated applications to the court for a final possession order if the arrears continue to accumulate on facts where the court is merely likely spread out further the repayment of the arrears.

The panel of judges unanimously overturned the courts below and rebuked the parties' repeated applications which resulted in a series of court hearings and orders — each imposing more affordable payment plans still within the term of the mortgage. It instead issued an eightfold list of criteria for future court cases to look to in assessing what order they will make in relation to arrears, taking into account expert evidence including factors cited by the Council of Mortgage Lenders; the aim being to avoid either side engaging in frequent applications ("vexatious litigation") or other abuse of judicial process.

== Facts ==
Mrs Norgan borrowed £90,000 repayable each month along with interest over 22 years (i.e. on a repayment mortgage), secured on the family farmhouse. Rates were initially 11 1/4% in the 1970s and with the Bank of England base rate fluctuated. When she fell behind, C&G sought possession, and this was stayed on several occasions. As they built up C&G tried again.

== Judgment ==
Waite LJ, 353, ‘the court should take as its starting point the full term of the mortgage and pose at the outset the question: “Would it be possible for the mortgagor to maintain payment-off of the arrears by instalments over that period?”’ The courts would probably need to consider more comprehensive accounts and financial information, but that and accompanying practical difficulties ‘should not however be allowed, in my judgment, to stand in the way of giving effect to the clearly intended scheme of the legislation.’ They had been to court many times and C&G was adding the cost of its proceedings to the bill against Mrs Norgan and her husband, who were struggling along. These will ultimately have to be paid and that shows the disadvantage of multiple and continued applications to court under the Administration of Justice Act 1970 section 36.

One advantage of taking the period most favourable to the mortgagor at the outset is that, if his or her hopes of repayment prove to be ill-founded and the new instalments initially ordered as a condition of suspension are not maintained but themselves fall into arrear, the mortgagee can be heard with justice to say that the mortgagor has had his chance, and that the section 36 powers… should not be employed repeatedly to compel a lending institution which has already suffered interruption of the regular flow of interest to which it was entitled under the express terms of the mortgage to accept assurances of future payment from a borrower in whom it has lost confidence.

Evans LJ agreed:

In conclusion, a practical summary of our judgments may be helpful in future cases. Drawing on the above and on the judgment of Waite L.J., the following considerations are likely to be relevant when a “reasonable period” has to be established for the purposes of section 36 of the Act of 1970.

(a) How much can the borrower reasonably afford to pay, both now and in the future?
(b) If the borrower has a temporary difficulty in meeting his obligations, how long is the difficulty likely to last?
(c) What was the reason for the arrears which have accumulated?
(d) How much remains of the original term?
(e) What are relevant contractual terms, and what type of mortgage is it, i.e. when is the principal due to be repaid?
(f) Is it a case where the court should exercise its power to disregard accelerated payment provisions (section 8 of the Act of 1973)?
(g) Is it reasonable to expect the lender, in the circumstances of the particular case, to recoup the arrears of interest

(1) over the whole of the original term, or
(2) within a shorter period, or even
(3) within a longer period, i.e. by extending the repayment period? Is it reasonable to expect the lender to capitalise the interest or not?

(h) Are there any reasons affecting the security which should influence the length of the period for payment?

In the light of the answers to the above, the court can proceed to exercise its overall discretion, taking account also of any further factors which may arise in the particular case.

The court therefore remitted the case to the county court for an application to adduce further evidence, assisting with forming a resolute judgment under these criteria.

== See also ==
- English land law
- English trusts law
- English property law

Similar cases

Bristol & West Building Society v Ellis [1996] EWCA Civ 1294
