= Tabarak-e Olya =

Tabarak-e Olya تبرك عليا
- Village
- Location within Iran
- Coordinates: 32°11′48″N 50°01′00″E
- Country: Iran
- Province: Chaharmahal and Bakhtiari
- County: Kuhrang
- Bakhsh: Bazoft
- Rural District: Bazoft

Population (2006)
  - Total: 182
- Time zone: UTC+3:30 (IRST)
  - Summer (DST): UTC+4:30 (IRDT)

Tabarak-e Olya (Persian: تبرك عليا, also Romanized as Ţabarak-e ‘Olyā; also known as Tabarak-e Bālā) is a village in Bazoft Rural District, Bazoft District, Kuhrang County, Chaharmahal and Bakhtiari Province, Iran. At the 2006 census, its population was 182 in 32 families. The village is populated by Lurs.
