= Karkon-e Sofla =

Karkon-e Sofla كاركن سفلي
- Village
- Location within Iran
- Coordinates: 32°41′06″N 49°32′05″E
- Country: Iran
- Province: Chaharmahal and Bakhtiari
- County: Kuhrang
- Bakhsh: Bazoft
- Rural District: Bazoft

Population (2006)
  - Total: 39
- Time zone: UTC+3:30 (IRST)
  - Summer (DST): UTC+4:30 (IRDT)

Karkon-e Sofla (Persian: كاركن سفلي, also Romanized as Kārkon-e Soflá) is a village in Bazoft Rural District, Bazoft District, Kuhrang County, Chaharmahal and Bakhtiari Province, Iran. At the 2006 census, its population was 39, in 5 families.

The village is populated by Lurs.
