= Tepa-ye Sofla =

Tepa-ye Sofla تپاسفلي
- Village
- Location within Iran
- Coordinates: 32°17′51″N 49°58′18″E
- Country: Iran
- Province: Chaharmahal and Bakhtiari
- County: Kuhrang
- Bakhsh: Bazoft
- Rural District: Bazoft

Population (2006)
  - Total: 51
- Time zone: UTC+3:30 (IRST)
  - Summer (DST): UTC+4:30 (IRDT)

Tepa-ye Sofla (Persian: تپاسفلي, also Romanized as Tepā-ye Soflá; also known as Tīā-ye Soflá) is a village in Bazoft Rural District, Bazoft District, Kuhrang County, Chaharmahal and Bakhtiari Province, Iran. At the 2006 census, its population was 51, in 9 families. The village is populated by Lurs.
