= Algi-ye Sofla =

Algi-ye Sofla الگي سفلي
- Village
- Location within Iran
- Coordinates: 32°16′47″N 50°00′14″E
- Country: Iran
- Province: Chaharmahal and Bakhtiari
- County: Kuhrang
- Bakhsh: Bazoft
- Rural District: Bazoft

Population (2006)
  - Total: 57
- Time zone: UTC+3:30 (IRST)
  - Summer (DST): UTC+4:30 (IRDT)

Algi-ye Sofla (Persian: الگي سفلي, also Romanized as ‘Algī-ye Soflá) is a village in Bazoft Rural District, Bazoft District, Kuhrang County, Chaharmahal and Bakhtiari Province, Iran. At the 2006 census, its population was 57, in 11 families. The village is populated by Lurs.
