= Mavarz =

Village in Chaharmahal and Bakhtiari province, Iran

Mavarz Persian: مورز
- Village
- Location within Iran
- Coordinates: 32°09′02″N 50°06′17″E
- Country: Iran
- Province: Chaharmahal and Bakhtiari
- County: Kuhrang
- District: Bazoft
- Rural District: Bazoft-e Pain

Population (2016)
  - Total: 1,201
- Time zone: UTC+3:30 (IRST)

Mavarz (Persian: مورز) (Note: Also romanized as Moorz and Mūraz) is a village in Bazoft-e Pain Rural District (Note: Formerly Bazoft Rural District) of Bazoft District in Kuhrang County, Chaharmahal and Bakhtiari province, Iran.

== Demographics ==
=== Ethnicity ===
The village is populated by Lurs.

=== Population ===
At the time of the 2006 National Census, the village's population was 224 in 42 households, when it was in Doab Rural District. The following census in 2011 counted 226 people in 48 households, by which time the village had been transferred to Bazoft-e Pain Rural District. The 2016 census measured the population of the village as 1,201 people in 315 households.
