= Lebd-e Sofla =

Village in Chaharmahal and Bakhtiari province, Iran

Lebd-e Sofla Persian: لبدسفلي
- Village
- Location within Iran
- Coordinates: 32°38′09″N 49°35′48″E
- Country: Iran
- Province: Chaharmahal and Bakhtiari
- County: Kuhrang
- District: Bazoft
- Rural District: Bazoft-e Bala

Population (2016)
  - Total: 396
- Time zone: UTC+3:30 (IRST)

Lebd-e Sofla (Persian: لبدسفلي) (Note: Also romanized as Lebd-e Soflá) is a village in Bazoft-e Bala Rural District of Bazoft District in Kuhrang County, Chaharmahal and Bakhtiari province, Iran.

== Demographics ==
=== Population ===
At the time of the 2006 National Census, the village's population was 67 in 10 households, when it was a village in Bazoft Rural District. (Note: Renamed Bazoft-e Pain Rural District) The village did not appear in the following census of 2011. The 2016 census measured the population of the village as 396 people in 84 households, by which time it had been transferred to Bazoft-e Bala Rural District created in the district.
