= Mian Dowhan-e Olya =

Mian Dowhan-e Olya ميان دوهان عليا
- Village
- Location within Iran
- Coordinates: 32°12′19″N 50°05′30″E
- Country: Iran
- Province: Chaharmahal and Bakhtiari
- County: Kuhrang
- Bakhsh: Bazoft
- Rural District: Bazoft

Population (2006)
  - Total: 121
- Time zone: UTC+3:30 (IRST)
  - Summer (DST): UTC+4:30 (IRDT)

Mian Dowhan-e Olya (Persian: ميان دوهان عليا, also Romanized as Mīān Dowhān-e ‘Olyā; also known as Meyān Dehān, Mīān, Mīān Dahān, Mīān Dahān-e ‘Olyā, and Mīān Dowhān) is a village in Bazoft Rural District, Bazoft District, Kuhrang County, Chaharmahal and Bakhtiari Province, Iran. At the 2006 census, its population was 121, in 25 families. The village is populated by Lurs.
