= Karkon-e Olya =

Karkon-e Olya كاركن عليا
- Village
- Country: Iran
- Province: Chaharmahal and Bakhtiari
- County: Kuhrang
- Bakhsh: Bazoft
- Rural District: Bazoft

Population (2006)
  - Total: 328
- Time zone: UTC+3:30 (IRST)
  - Summer (DST): UTC+4:30 (IRDT)

Karkon-e Olya (Persian: كاركن عليا, also Romanized as Kārkon-e ‘Olyā) is a village in Bazoft Rural District, Bazoft District, Kuhrang County, Chaharmahal and Bakhtiari Province, Iran. At the 2006 census, its population was 328, in 65 families. The village is populated by Lurs.
