= Gazestan, Chaharmahal and Bakhtiari =

Village in Chaharmahal and Bakhtiari province, Iran

Gazestan Persian: گزستان
- Village
- Location within Iran
- Coordinates: 32°06′36″N 50°07′11″E
- Country: Iran
- Province: Chaharmahal and Bakhtiari
- County: Kuhrang
- District: Bazoft
- Rural District: Bazoft-e Pain

Population (2016)
  - Total: 742
- Time zone: UTC+3:30 (IRST)

Gazestan (Persian: گزستان) (Note: Also romanized as Gazestān) is a village in Bazoft-e Pain Rural District (Note: Formerly Bazoft Rural District) of Bazoft District in Kuhrang County, Chaharmahal and Bakhtiari province, Iran.

== Demographics ==
=== Ethnicity ===
The village is populated by Lurs.

=== Population ===
At the time of the 2006 National Census, the village's population was 659 in 116 households, when it was in Doab Rural District. The following census in 2011 counted 769 people in 182 households, by which time the village had been transferred to Bazoft-e Pain Rural District. The 2016 census measured the population of the village as 742 people in 187 households.
