= Cham Qaleh, Chaharmahal and Bakhtiari =

Village in Chaharmahal and Bakhtiari province, Iran

Cham Qaleh Persian: چم قلعه
- Village
- Location within Iran
- Country: Iran
- Province: Chaharmahal and Bakhtiari
- County: Kuhrang
- District: Bazoft
- Rural District: Bazoft-e Pain

Population (2016)
  - Total: 1,469
- Time zone: UTC+3:30 (IRST)

Cham Qaleh (Persian: چم قلعه) (Note: Also romanized as Cham Qal‘eh; also known as Cham Qal‘eh-ye Pā’īn) is a village in Bazoft-e Pain Rural District (Note: Formerly Bazoft Rural District) of Bazoft District in Kuhrang County, Chaharmahal and Bakhtiari province, Iran.

== Demographics ==
=== Ethnicity ===
The village is populated by Lurs.

=== Population ===
At the time of the 2006 National Census, the village's population was 891 in 134 households. The following census in 2011 counted 1,077 people in 200 households. The 2016 census measured the population of the village as 1,469 people in 309 households. It was the most populous village in its rural district.
