= Cheltenham & Gloucester =

UK mortgage and savings provider

Cheltenham & Gloucester plc

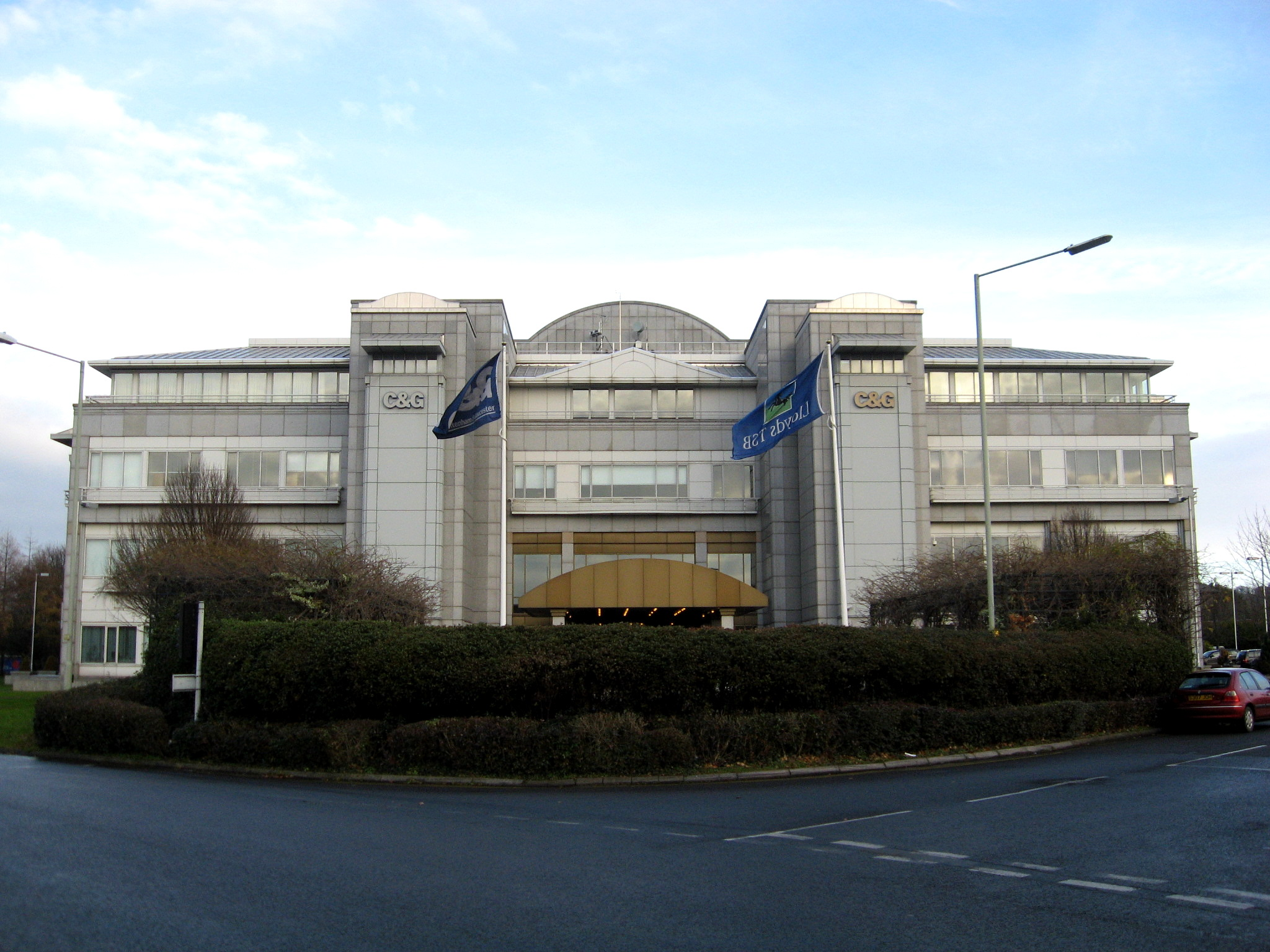
- Headquarters of Cheltenham & Gloucester at Barnwood, Gloucestershire
- Trade name: C&G
- Company type: Subsidiary undertaking
- Industry: Finance and insurance
- Founded: Cheltenham, United Kingdom (1850)
- Fate: Acquired by Lloyds Bank
- Successor: Lloyds Bank; TSB Bank
- Headquarters: Barnwood, Gloucestershire, United Kingdom
- Area served: England; Wales; Scotland
- Products: Financial services
- Parent: Lloyds Banking Group

Cheltenham & Gloucester plc (C&G) was a mortgage and savings provider in the United Kingdom. C&G specialised in mortgages and savings products. Previously, C&G was a building society, the Cheltenham and Gloucester Building Society. Its headquarters were in Barnwood, Gloucester, Gloucestershire, England. It was acquired by Lloyds Bank in 2009.

== History ==
=== Formation and development ===
C&G can trace its roots back to the Cheltenham and Gloucestershire Permanent Mutual Benefit Building and Investment Association. Its inaugural meeting, held at the Belle Vue Hotel, Cheltenham took place on 7 August 1850, and the society shortened its name to Cheltenham and Gloucestershire Benefit Building Society. The first President of the society was James Downing, of Cheltenham. Downing believed in a philosophy whereupon it was a citizen's duty to help other citizens and this was a driving force for him in helping the poor to achieve stability through home ownership. Even so, the Society was run rather shrewdly, and upon Downing's death in 1868, it had an annual income of £37,000.

At first the Society was based in Cheltenham; its first Gloucester branch opened in 1896. Over the next 80 years, it expanded throughout the UK, opening its 100th branch in Pershore in 1979. During the 1980s, C&G acquired several smaller building societies, as consolidation of the sector intensified. C&G's headquarters were at Cheltenham House in central Cheltenham until their move to Barnwood in 1989. The then building society had commissioned a sculpture by British artist Barbara Hepworth, "Theme and Variations", which can still be seen displayed on the front of Cheltenham House.

In 1984 Cotswold Building Society transferred its undertakings to C&G. This was followed by the Waltham Abbey in 1985, the Colchester, the London Permanent and the Cardiff in 1987, the Essex Equitable and the Bolton in 1988, the Bury St Edmunds in 1989, the Bedford, the Guardian, the Peckham and the Walthamstow in 1990, the Portsmouth and the Bedford Crown in 1991, and the Mid-Sussex in 1992 (despite a controversy surrounding the bank which prompted an investigation by ITV's The Cook Report that year).

In 1993 C&G merged with the Heart of England Building Society. By the mid 1990s it had taken over the Portsmouth, Guardian, Peckham, Walthamstow, Cardiff, Colchester, London Permanent, Bolton, Bury St Edmunds and Essex Equitable building societies.

C&G converted to a bank in 1995. This involved the demutualisation of the society, and generated a windfall payment to its members. It was then acquired by Lloyds Bank later in 1995.

In 2007 C&G was restructured and closed 31 of its 195 branches, resulting in the loss of 315 jobs.

A former branch of the C&G in Peterborough, Cambridgeshire - rebranded TSB in September 2013

On 9 June 2009, it was reported that Lloyds Banking Group would close Cheltenham & Gloucester's 164 branches in November of that year, at the cost of around 1,660 jobs. Lloyds stated that the C&G brand name would be retained for mortgages and savings, while customers could use any branch of Lloyds TSB to access their accounts. However, on 19 August 2009, Lloyds announced that it would review this decision.

C&G had its own staff association, which represented members of staff in the building society for collective bargaining purposes and individual members of the staff association for disciplinary and grievance purposes. In 2004 the staff association merged with the trade union Amicus, retaining its own 'C&GSA' branding until Amicus merged with the TGWU in 2007 to form Unite.

=== Project Verde ===
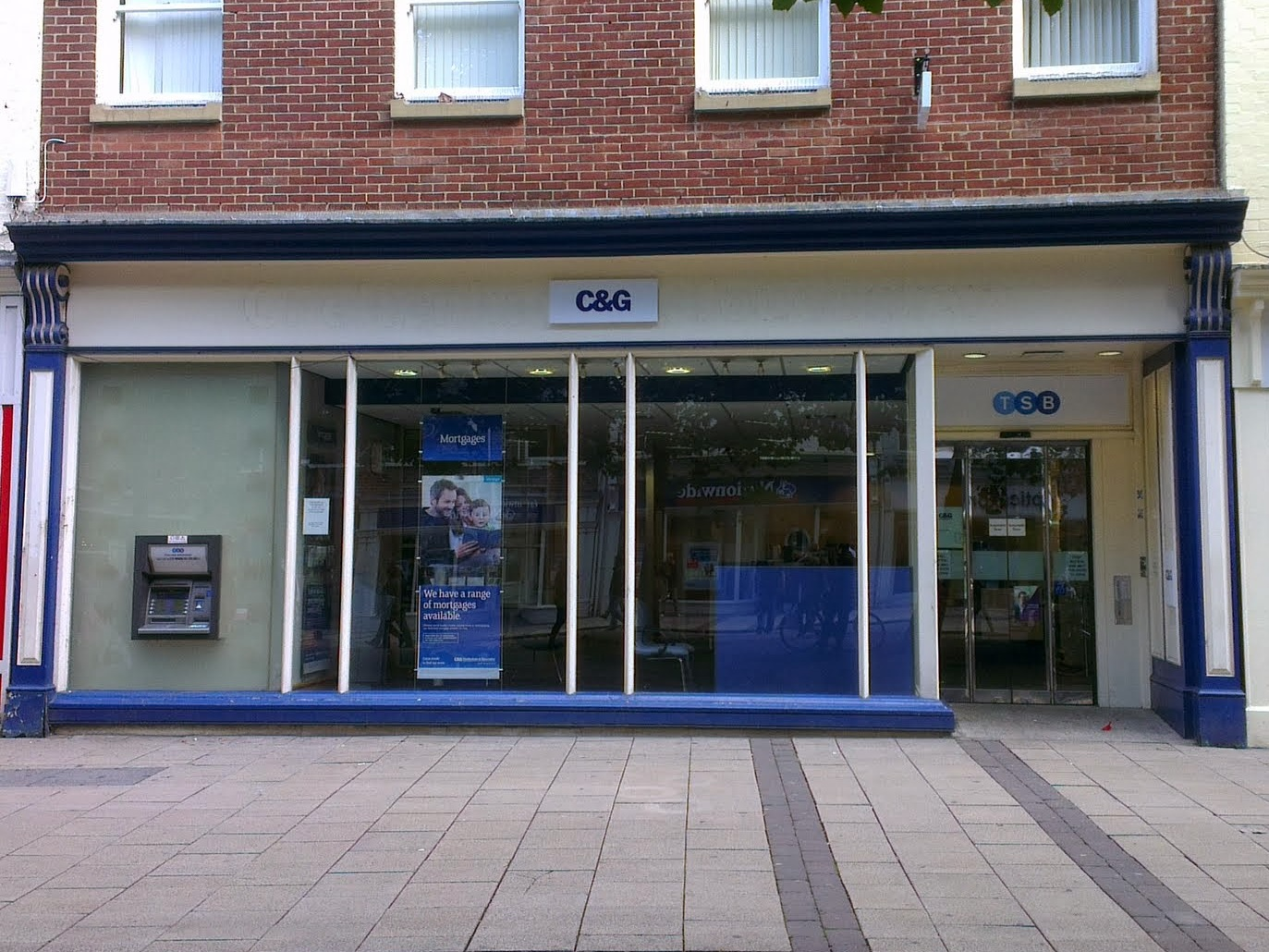
C&G York branch, before rebranding

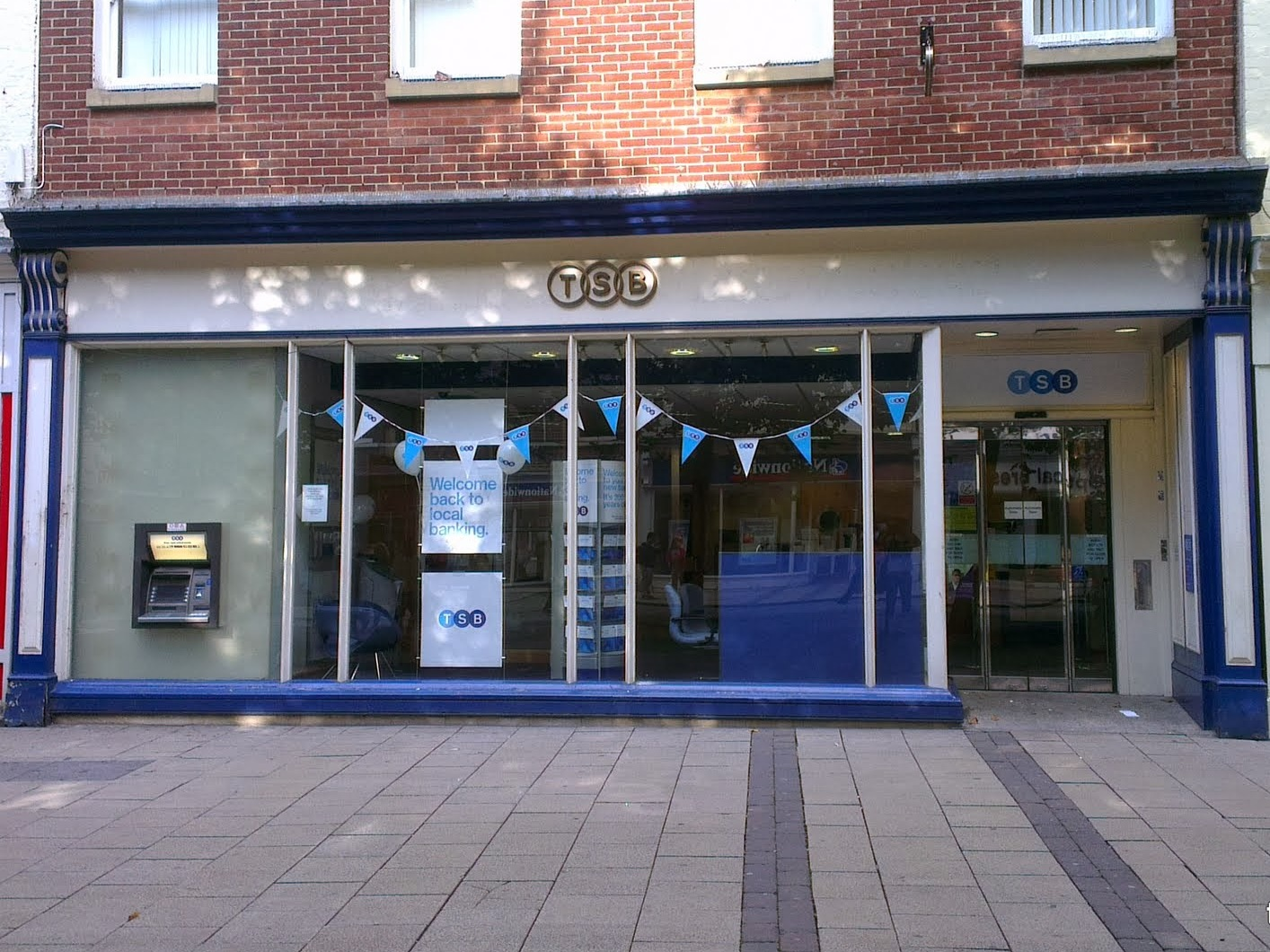
C&G York branch, after rebranding

Speculation had arisen that Lloyds was to sell off C&G after the European Commission demanded in late 2009 that it sell off existing branches in order to allay competition concerns following a bail-out by the UK government. Lloyds announced the creation of Project Verde in November 2009.

In July 2012, it was announced that all of the C&G branches, along with some Lloyds TSB branches, would be sold to The Co-operative Bank and rebranded as TSB. However, in April 2013 the Co-operative Bank decided not to proceed with the acquisition, citing the economic downturn and tougher regulatory environment imposed on banks. Lloyds Banking Group confirmed that the rebranding to TSB would still take place.

On 13 June 2013 the Treasury Select Committee announced an inquiry into the required divestment of the Verde branches and the collapsed bid from The Co-operative Bank. The inquiry published its final report in October 2014.

=== Closure ===
In September 2013, all former C&G branches were transferred to the newly established TSB Bank as part of a divestment of a significant portion of the Lloyds TSB business by Lloyds Banking Group. At the formation of the new TSB Bank, C&G no longer had any branches, and was closed to new business. Retained C&G mortgages were administered by Cheltenham and Gloucester plc and provided by Lloyds Bank plc. Retained savings accounts were held with C&G Savings, a trading division of Lloyds Bank plc. Following the transfer of all C&G branches to TSB Bank plc, C&G products could be serviced at Lloyds Bank branches, by phone or by post. By April 2017, all remaining mortgage administration had been transferred to Lloyds Bank and rebranded.

== See also ==
- Cheltenham & Gloucester Building Society v Norgan
- Cheltenham & Gloucester Trophy
- Walter Ansell, What Lasts a Century can have no Flaw The Centenary History of the Cheltenham and Glooucester Building Society 1850-1950', 1950
