= Tabarak-e Sofla =

Village in Chaharmahal and Bakhtiari province, Iran

Tabarak-e Sofla Persian: تبرك سفلي
- Village
- Location within Iran
- Coordinates: 32°11′24″N 50°01′16″E
- Country: Iran
- Province: Chaharmahal and Bakhtiari
- County: Kuhrang
- District: Bazoft
- Rural District: Bazoft-e Pain

Population (2016)
  - Total: 572
- Time zone: UTC+3:30 (IRST)

Tabarak-e Sofla (Persian: تبرك سفلي) (Note: Also romanized as Ţabarak-e Soflá) is a village in Bazoft-e Pain Rural District (Note: Formerly Bazoft Rural District) of Bazoft District in Kuhrang County, Chaharmahal and Bakhtiari province, Iran.

== Demographics ==
=== Ethnicity ===
The village is populated by Lurs.

=== Population ===
At the time of the 2006 National Census, the village's population was 405 in 65 households. The following census in 2011 counted 746 people in 139 households. The 2016 census measured the population of the village as 572 people in 113 households.
