= Farzad Bazoft =

Iranian journalist (1958–1990)

- Screengrab of Bazoft during his forced confession on Iraqi TV, 1989
- Born: 22 May 1958; Pahlavi Iran
- Died: 15 March 1990 (aged 31); Baghdad, Ba'athist Iraq
- Resting place: Highgate Cemetery, London
- Occupation: Journalist
- Writing career
- Period: c. 1980s–1990
- Subject: Middle East

Farzad Bazoft (Persian: فرزاد بازفت; 22 May 1958 – 15 March 1990) was an Iranian journalist who settled in the United Kingdom in the mid-1970s. He worked as a freelance reporter for The Observer. He was arrested by Iraqi authorities and executed in 1990 after being convicted of spying for Israel while working in Iraq.

== Biography ==
Bazoft went to live in the United Kingdom in 1975 at the age of 16. He was sentenced to 18 months jail after robbing the Heart of England Building Society in Brackley in 1981. The sentence included a deportation order, which Bazoft appealed against successfully in 1983.

After finishing his education he began a career as a freelance journalist, contributing articles about the Middle East and, in particular, the Iran–Iraq War to news outlets including The Observer and the BBC. In 1989 he was invited by the Iraqi government to come to Iraq along with other journalists to report on elections being held in Kurdistan. Before Bazoft set off, he learned about a mysterious explosion that had occurred on 19 September 1989 at the al-Iskandaria military complex, 50 kilometres (31 mi) south of Baghdad. The heavy detonation was heard as far away as Baghdad. Despite Saddam Hussein's personal order to keep the matter secret, rumours began to spread that the accident happened in a rocket factory's assembly line, killing dozens of Egyptian technicians involved in Iraq's secret development of medium-range ballistic missiles.

Sensing a possible scoop, Bazoft headed for al-Hilla to search for details. He allegedly undertook his investigation with the approval of Iraqi officials. Observer editor Donald Trelford said in response to Bazoft's arrest: "Farzad Bazoft is not a spy. He is a reporter who went to do a story. He said in advance the story he was going to do. He told the Baghdad government where he wanted to go. ... This is not the action of a spy, this is the action of a reporter." Other Western reporters were also interested in the story, but a camera crew from Independent Television News was stopped by Iraqi authorities before they could reach the plant. Bazoft got through, driven by British nurse Daphne Parish. Bazoft also asked military personnel in Baghdad hotels and casinos what they knew and was reported by hotel security to the Iraqi Intelligence Service.

Bazoft was arrested at Baghdad International Airport in September 1989, while waiting for his flight back to London. He had 34 photographs of the area of al-Hilla in his luggage, and some soil from near the factory. After six weeks in custody at the Abu Ghraib prison, and, after beatings, Bazoft was put in front of TV cameras on 1 November and made to confess to being an Israeli agent. Parish had also been arrested by Iraqi authorities. Before their trial, President Saddam Hussein wrote to British prime minister Margaret Thatcher assuring her that Bazoft and Parish would get a fair trial.

Following a one-day trial behind closed doors, lacking conclusive evidence of his guilt, Bazoft was convicted and sentenced to death on 10 March 1990. Parish was sentenced to 15 years in prison, but she was released on 16 July 1990 following a plea for clemency from Zambian president Kenneth Kaunda.

International appeals for clemency for Bazoft had no effect. He was not permitted to appeal against his conviction or sentence, and was executed by hanging at 6:30am on 15 March 1990.

== Aftermath ==
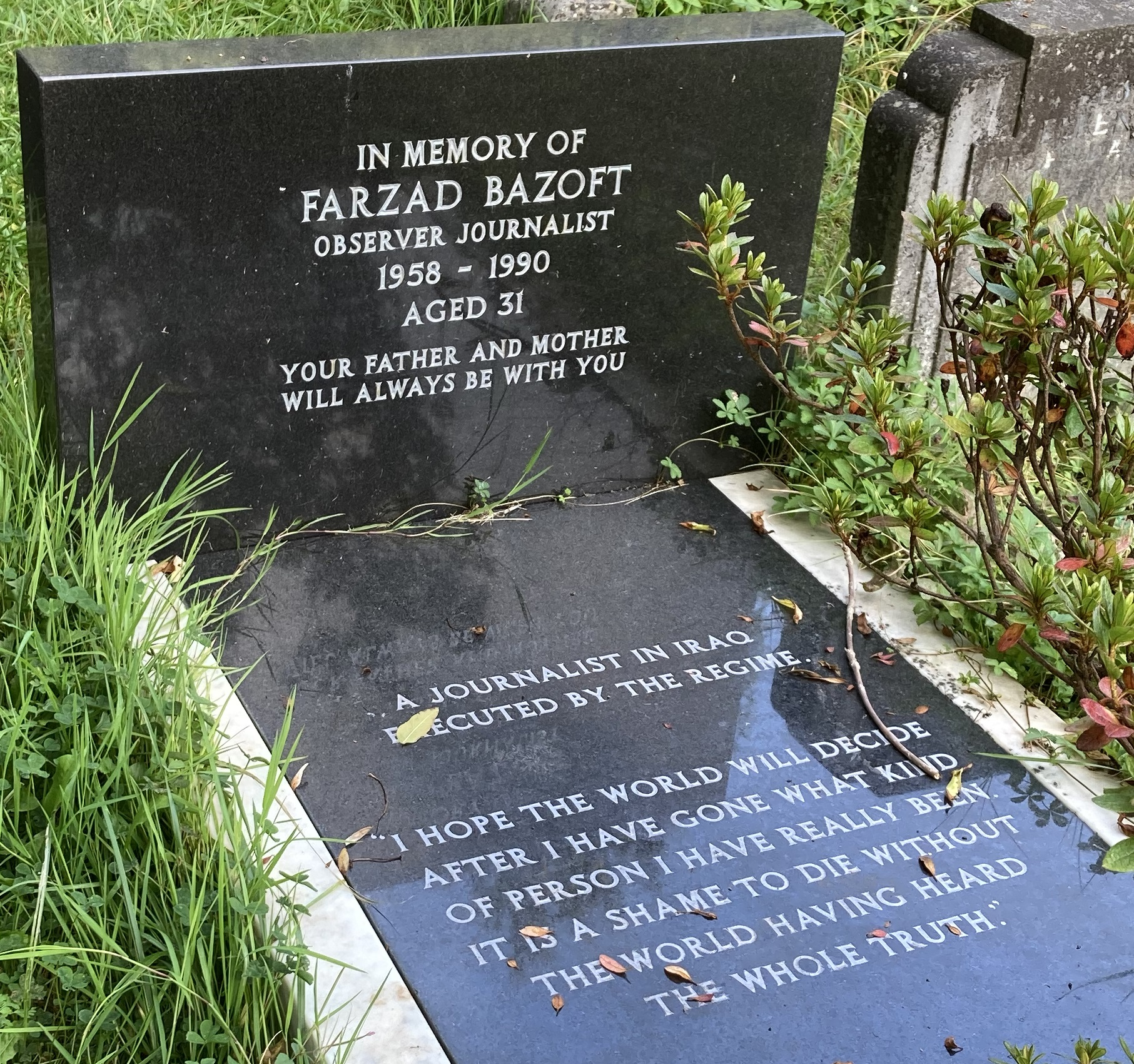
Grave of Farzad Bazoft in the east side of Highgate Cemetery

Bazoft's body was placed in a rough wooden crate and despatched to his family in the United Kingdom. Documents seized during the invasion of Iraq in 2003 confirm that Saddam Hussein personally stressed the need for Bazoft's execution to take place before Ramadan (which began that year on 16 March), to quash attempts for clemency by the British government.

Immediately after the execution, Britain recalled its ambassador to Iraq and cancelled all ministerial visits, though the Conservative Party was not unanimous on the response, with Conservative MPs Rupert Allason and Anthony Beaumont-Dark supporting the Iraqi government response, and Phil Dicks even publicly stating on the day before the execution that Bazoft "deserved to be hanged". Bazoft's story nonetheless triggered widespread outrage in the West and contributed to international isolation of Saddam's regime. Months after the incident, on 2 August 1990, Iraq invaded Kuwait, sparking the first Gulf War. During that war, the command tank of the UK's 7th Armoured Brigade was named Bazoft's Revenge.

In 2003, The Observer tracked down Kadem Askar, the colonel in the Iraqi intelligence service who conducted the initial interrogation of Bazoft. He admitted that he knew Bazoft was innocent, but that he was powerless to obstruct Saddam Hussein's orders to have him convicted and executed. That Hussein himself ordered the execution of Bazoft is confirmed in transcripts of taped meetings made by the Hussein regime and seized during the 2003 invasion.

The release of papers from 1990 at the beginning of 2017 revealed that the Thatcher government decided to take no action against Iraq out of an anxiety that doing so might risk British exports. Norman Lamont, chief secretary to the treasury in 1990, told The Observer: "There was some argument about how British he was – he did have an Iranian passport and that was the decisive thing: he wasn't a British citizen". Bazoft qualified for British residency.
