= Chaman Goli =

Neighborhood in Chaharmahal and Bakhtiari province, Iran

Chaman Goli Persian: چمن گلي
- Neighborhood
- Location within Iran
- Coordinates: 32°12′42″N 50°01′58″E
- Country: Iran
- Province: Chaharmahal and Bakhtiari
- County: Kuhrang
- District: Bazoft
- City: Bazoft

Population (2011)
  - Total: 260
- Time zone: UTC+3:30 (IRST)

Chaman Goli (Persian: چمن گلي) (Note: Also romanized as Chaman Golī) is a neighborhood in the city of Bazoft in Bazoft District of Kuhrang County, Chaharmahal and Bakhtiari province, Iran. As a village it served as capital of both the district and the rural district.

== Demographics ==
=== Ethnicity ===
The neighborhood is populated by Lurs.

=== Population ===
At the time of the 2006 National Census, Chaman Goli's population was 332 in 50 households, when it was a village in Bazoft Rural District. (Note: Renamed Bazoft-e Pain Rural District) The following census in 2011 counted 260 people in 54 households.

Chaman Goli was merged with the village of Telurd in the formation of the city of Bazoft in 2013.
