= Bazoft-e Bala Rural District =

Rural district in Chaharmahal and Bakhtiari province, Iran

Bazoft-e Bala Rural District Persian: دهستان بازفت بالا
- Rural District
- Location within Iran
- Coordinates: 32°32′N 49°45′E
- Country: Iran
- Province: Chaharmahal and Bakhtiari
- County: Kuhrang
- District: Bazoft
- Established: 2009
- Capital: Dehnash

Population (2016)
  - Total: 4,144
- Time zone: UTC+3:30 (IRST)

Bazoft-e Bala Rural District (Persian: دهستان بازفت بالا) is in Bazoft District of Kuhrang County, Chaharmahal and Bakhtiari province, Iran. Its capital is the village of Dehnash.

== History ==
Bazoft-e Bala Rural District was created in Bazoft District in 2009.

== Demographics ==
=== Population ===
At the time of the 2011 National Census, the rural district's population was 3,305 inhabitants in 655 households. The 2016 census measured the population of the rural district as 4,144 in 1,000 households. The most populous of its 54 villages was Shahrak-e Kushka, with 528 people.

=== Other villages in the rural district ===
- Lebd-e Sofla
- Shahrak-e Mazeh Sukhteh
