= Bristol & West Building Society v Ellis =

- Court: Court of Appeal
- Full case name: Bristol and West Building Society v John Howard Ellis and Barbara Anne Ellis
- Decided: 24 April 1996
- Citations: [1996] EWCA Civ 1294 (1997) 73 P&CR 158

Case history
- Prior action: Appellant lost at appeal before HHJ MacNaught in the Bristol County Court. Leapfrog-appealed to Court of Appeal.

Court membership
- Judges sitting: Hirst LJ; Auld LJ

Case opinions
- Auld LJ

Keywords
- Mortgage

Bristol & West Building Society v Ellis [1996] is an English land law case, concerning mortgage arrears, specifically the definition of "such time as the court thinks reasonable" for its suspension of possession orders under section 36 of the Administration of Justice Act 1970.

It was held on the facts that the delay was not appropriate because there was a risk that if the delay was granted, the mortgagor’s debt would rise too much, possibly into negative equity, which outweighed the interest in the two children completing their higher and further education respectively.

== Facts ==
Mrs Ellis fell into arrears after her husband left. A credible payment plan for her would have taken 98 years. She applied for suspension of a warrant for possession because she wanted sell the property in three to five years when her children had finished full-time education. To support her application, she gave the opinions of estate agents showing what the likely sale price would be. This was argued to be enough to discharge the debt and therefore the mortgage, balancing the interests of her children and the interest of the lender who was no longer receiving full mortgage instalments.

The Judge (at first instance, the court below the appeal made) granted an order to delay.

== Judgment ==
The two-member panel in the Court of Appeal through the written judgment of Auld LJ held that the delay was not appropriate because there was a risk that if the delay was granted, the mortgagor’s debt would rise too much. The total debt was £70k plus £10k interest. Auld LJ held that the estate agents’ opinions were not good enough. The court will need evidence or at least some informal material before the court is satisfied of what period for sale is reasonable.

It all depends on the individual circumstances of each case, though the important factors in most are likely to be the extent to which the mortgage debt and arrears are secured by the value of the property and the effect of time on that security...

As to value, the evidence was not compelling: two estate agents’ estimates of between £80,000 and £85,000 as against the redemption figure at the time of just over £77,000 plus costs...

‘Give the inevitable uncertainty as to the movement of property values over the next few years and the reserve with which the courts should approach estate agents’ estimates of sale prices… no court could be sanguine about the adequacy, now or continuing over that period, of the property as security for the mortgage debt and arrears.

== See also ==
- English land law
- English trusts law
- English property law
