= Heart of England Building Society =

Former building society in England

- Type: Building Society (Mutual)
- Industry: Financial services
- Founded: 1974
- Defunct: 1993
- Fate: Acquired by the Cheltenham and Gloucester Building Society.
- Products: Savings, Mortgages

The Heart of England Building Society was a 1974 amalgamation of local building societies: the Warwick and Warwickshire; the Rugby; and the Walsall. Their only common feature was that they had remained very small for a century before beginning a limited expansion in the 1960s. However, the Heart of England grew to be the 25th largest society by 1993 when it was acquired by the Cheltenham and Gloucester Building Society.

== History ==
=== Warwick ===
The Warwick and Warwickshire Benefit Building Society held its first meeting in November 1853 and its rules were approved in February 1854. The Recorder of Warwick was President and the Vice-presidents were the Mayor and the two town MPs. Subscription meetings were held fortnightly in the evening and the first mortgage was granted in the May; however, it was another year before the third mortgage was granted and that slow progress was an indicator of things to come. Financial problems also limited the society’s progress. In 1875 the society discovered that the Secretary had not paid over all the money he had received and payments to members were temporarily suspended. The failure of the Warwick’s bankers, Greenaway, Smith and Greenaway, in 1887 was a further blow. By the time of WWI assets were still under £100,000.

The society’s history admitted to an opposition to change after the war and when the Chairman resigned in 1930, after having been a director for 42 years, he was described as “a brake on the society”. No branches had been opened and the limited outreach of the society was illustrated by the instructions to the new secretary in 1920: to attend Subscription Meetings at Warwick, Leamington Spa and Stratford-upon-Avon each fortnight and Banbury and Kenilworth each fourth week. It was not until 1960 that the directors recommended opening three branches– Kenilworth, Stratford and Banbury. Banbury was opened in 1961, and Stratford in 1962. This was as far as the society got before its amalgamation with the Rugby Building Society in 1966.

=== Rugby ===
The early history of the Rugby Building Society was far removed from the Warwick. In 1866 Dr Frederick Temple, headmaster of Rugby School and later Archbishop of Canterbury, chaired a public meeting to consider establishing a Freehold Land Society. It was duly formed as the Rugby Land Society but it was registered under the Benefit Building Societies Act 1836 as the Rugby Benefit Building Society. For the next 60 years it acted as a land society buying and developing land in Rugby and selling it on as serviced plots to members. Land development as the primary function continued unchallenged until 1926 when the society’s auditor pointed out that it was ultra vires to be buying and selling land. The society had no option but to dispose of its land and all new business became that of a traditional building society; at that date, its assets were little more than £300,000. There was a limited attempt at geographic expansion. A branch was opened in Banbury in 1927 and then long gaps before branches at Lutterworth in 1945, Leamington in 1962 and Stratford-on-Avon in 1965. The addition of these branches helped to increase assets from under £2m at the end of WWII to £11m in 1967. However, in the last two years of its independent existence, the society experienced financial irregularities in succession at Banbury, Stratford and Rugby involving police and prosecutions. It merged with the Warwick in 1967.

=== Rugby and Warwick ===
The Rugby and Warwick Society started its merged life in 1967; in 1969 it decided to invest in branches in six nearby towns. In the event it succeeded in Kidderminster in 1971, Redditch in 1972, and Birmingham in 1973. Its biggest move was the acquisition of the Oxford Provident Building Society in 1974. The Oxford was another society with an unusual provenance. It had been formed in 1860 as the Oxford and Industrial Provident Land and Building Society and registered under the Industrial and Provident Societies Act 1871. The Industrial Act severely limited the size of deposit that could be made and the society remained small until it dissolved and re-registered in 1963 under the Building Societies Act 1962. Its assets were a mere £337,000 on registration. These grew to over £2m by time of its acquisition by the Rugby and Warwick in March 1974. This took assets from £17m at the time of the Rugby and Warwick merge to £38m. Six months after the acquisition of the Oxford, the enlarged Rugby and Warwick merged with the Walsall Building Society. Although the engagements were transferred to the Walsall, the merger was one of equals with joint managing directors.

=== Walsall ===
Walsall Mutual Benefit Society held its first meeting in 1863 but little is known of its early history other than it was very small and stayed that way for a century. Its assets were only £65,000 by the onset of WWI, and less than £500,000 by WWII. It was not until 1949 that the Society decided that it needed a full-time Secretary but under John Richardson the next 25 years saw substantial expansion, Assets rose from a little over £500,00 to £2,4m in 1959, at which point the Society decided to develop branches. It was almost ten years before the first branch opened (Brownhills in 1968) by which time assets were over £10m. Four more branches had been opened by 1974 when the Society merged with Rugby and Warwick. Its assets had doubled to £23m in that five-year period.

=== Heart of England ===
The 1974 amalgamation of the Rugby and Warwick with the Walsall created a Society with assets of £66m and the concept of a merger of equals encouraged the creation of a new name – the Heart of England Building Society. On the merger, Rugby and Warwick brought in 12 branches and Walsall five, plus the two headquarters. Over the next five years a further eleven branches were opened, all in the midlands area. The Coalville Permanent Building Society, founded in 1912, was bought in 1978 followed by the South Birmingham Savings Society in 1981. That was the year when the Martin history finished, and the Society’s assets had increased to £149m. There were two more local acquisitions in 1988, the Kidderminster Equitable and the Rowley Regis but otherwise growth was organic.

In 1993 there was an abortive attempt to sell the Society to the recently formed Bank of Edinburgh. This was followed later that year by the Society’s absorption into the Cheltenham and Gloucester Building Society. By then, the Heart of England had become the 25th largest society with 230,000 savers and a billion pounds of assets. However, it was dwarfed by the Cheltenham which was sixteen times its size and with four times as many branches.
