= Bazoft, Kuhrang =

City in Chaharmahal and Bakhtiari province, Iran

Bazoft Persian: بازفت
- City
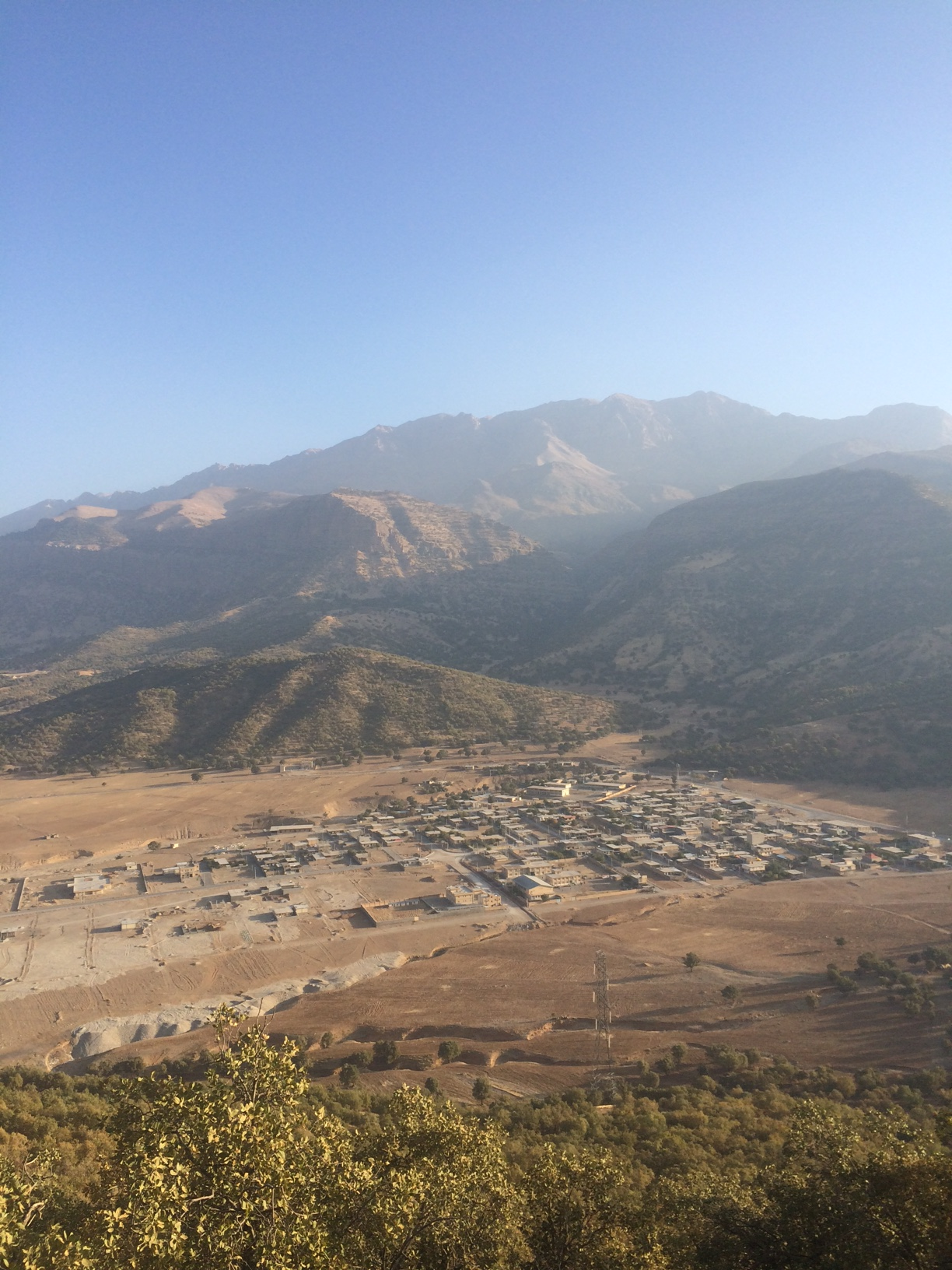

- Location within Iran
- Coordinates: 32°12′36″N 50°02′32″E
- Country: Iran
- Province: Chaharmahal and Bakhtiari
- County: Kuhrang
- District: Bazoft
- Established as a city: 2013

Population (2016)
  - Total: 1,519
- Time zone: UTC+3:30 (IRST)

Bazoft (Persian: بازفت) is a city in, and the capital of, Bazoft District in Kuhrang County, Chaharmahal and Bakhtiari province, Iran. The villages of Chaman Goli (چمن گلی) and Telurd (تلورد) were merged to form the new city of Bazoft in 2013.

== Demographics ==
=== Ethnicity ===
The city is populated by Lurs.

=== Population ===
At the time of the 2016 National Census, the city's population was 1,519 people in 337 households.
