= Bazoft-e Pain Rural District =

Rural district in Chaharmahal and Bakhtiari province, Iran

Bazoft-e Pain Rural District Persian: دهستان بازفت پايين
- Rural District
- Location within Iran
- Coordinates: 32°09′N 50°05′E
- Country: Iran
- Province: Chaharmahal and Bakhtiari
- County: Kuhrang
- District: Bazoft
- Established: 1987
- Capital: Bazoft

Population (2016)
  - Total: 9,079
- Time zone: UTC+3:30 (IRST)

Bazoft-e Pain Rural District (Persian: دهستان بازفت پايين) (Note: Formerly Bazoft Rural District (دهستان بازفت)) is in Bazoft District of Kuhrang County, Chaharmahal and Bakhtiari province, Iran. It is administered from the city of Bazoft. (Note: Formerly the village of Chaman Goli) The previous capital of the rural district was the village of Dehnash, now in Bazoft-e Bala Rural District.

== Demographics ==
=== Population ===
At the time of the 2006 National Census, the rural district's population (as Bazoft Rural District) (Note: Renamed Bazoft-e Pain Rural District) was 8,526 in 1,441 households. There were 8,880 inhabitants in 1,804 households in the census of 2011. The 2016 census measured the population of the rural district as 9,079 in 2,141 households. The most populous of its 45 villages was Cham Qaleh, with 1,469 people.

=== Other villages in the rural district ===
- Arteh
- Gazestan
- Mavarz
- Tabarak-e Sofla
