= Bazoft District =

District in Chaharmahal and Bakhtiari province, Iran

Bazoft District Persian: بخش بازفت
- District
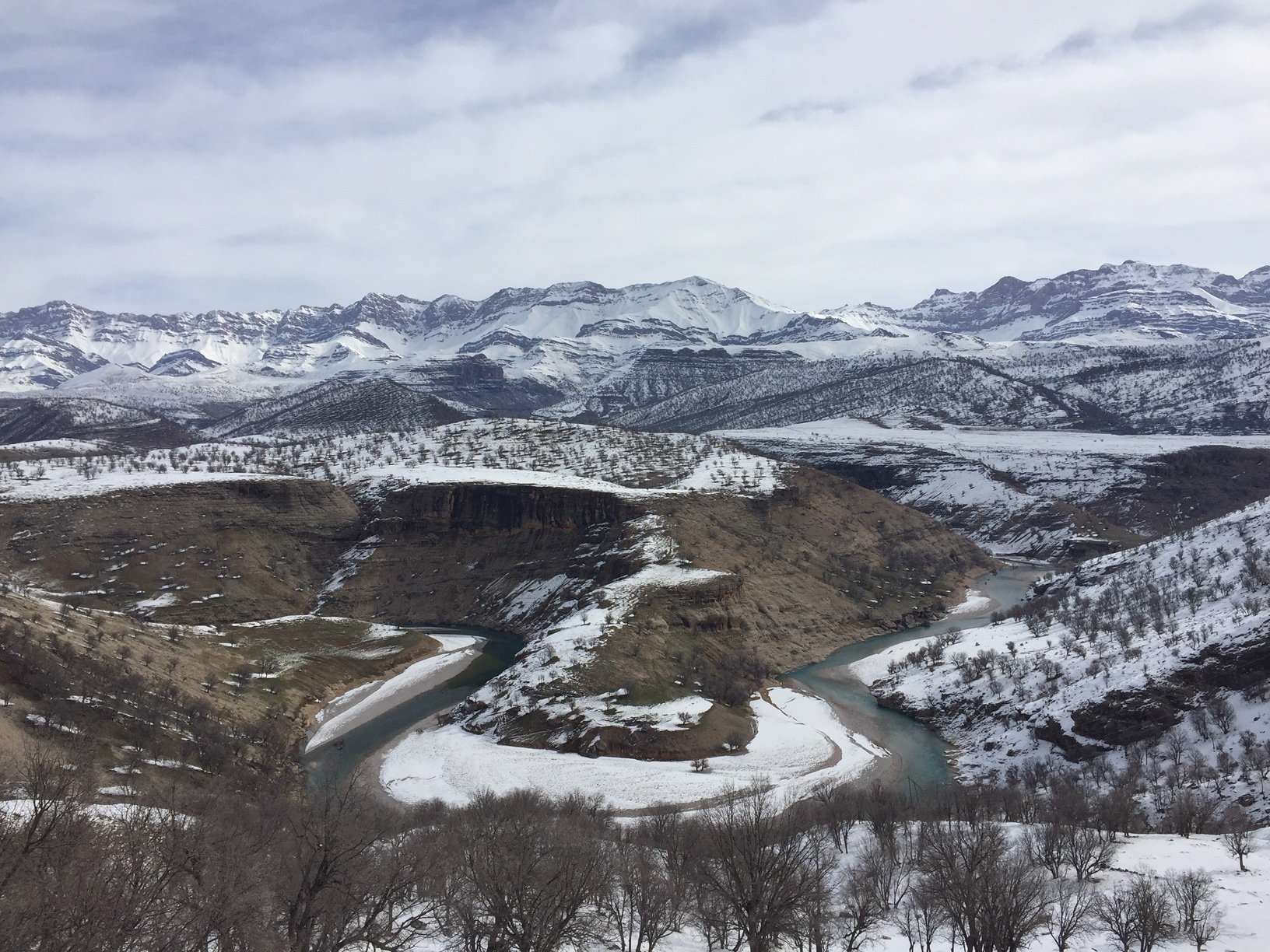
- View of Bazoft River with the Zardkuh mountain range in the background

- Location within Iran
- Coordinates: 32°23′N 49°52′E
- Country: Iran
- Province: Chaharmahal and Bakhtiari
- County: Kuhrang
- Established: 1995
- Capital: Bazoft
- Elevation: 1,520 m (4,990 ft)

Population (2016)
  - Total: 14,742
- Time zone: UTC+3:30 (IRST)
- Area code: +(98) 383

Bazoft District (Persian: بخش بازفت) is in Kuhrang County, Chaharmahal and Bakhtiari province, Iran. Its capital is the city of Bazoft. (Note: Formerly Chaman Goli)

== History ==
In 2009, Bazoft-e Bala Rural District was created in the district, and Doab Rural District was separated from it in the formation of Doab Samsami District. Two villages were merged to form the new city of Bazoft in 2013.

== Demographics ==
=== Ethnicity ===
The population is mainly composed of Bakhtiari Lurs from the Haft Lang tribes.

=== Population ===
At the time of the 2006 National Census, the district's population was 14,270 in 2,459 households. The following census in 2011 counted 12,185 people in 2,459 households. The 2016 census measured the population of the district as 14,742 inhabitants living in 3,478 households.

=== Administrative divisions ===
Bazoft District Population
Administrative Divisions	2006	2011	2016
Bazoft-e Bala RD		3,305	4,144
Bazoft-e Pain RD (Note: Formerly Bazoft Rural District)	8,526	8,880	9,079
Doab RD (Note: Transferred to Doab Samsami District)	5,744		
Bazoft (city)			1,519
Total	14,270	12,185	14,742
RD = Rural District

== Geography ==
In the heart of the Zagros mountains, in the foothills of the Zardkuh mountain range, the Bazoft district is located about 180km west of Shahrekord and 200km east of Masjed Soleyman on the Shahrekord-Masjed Soleyman road. The Bazoft river, located near the Zardkuh mountains, is one of the main affluents of the Karun river.

== Gallery ==
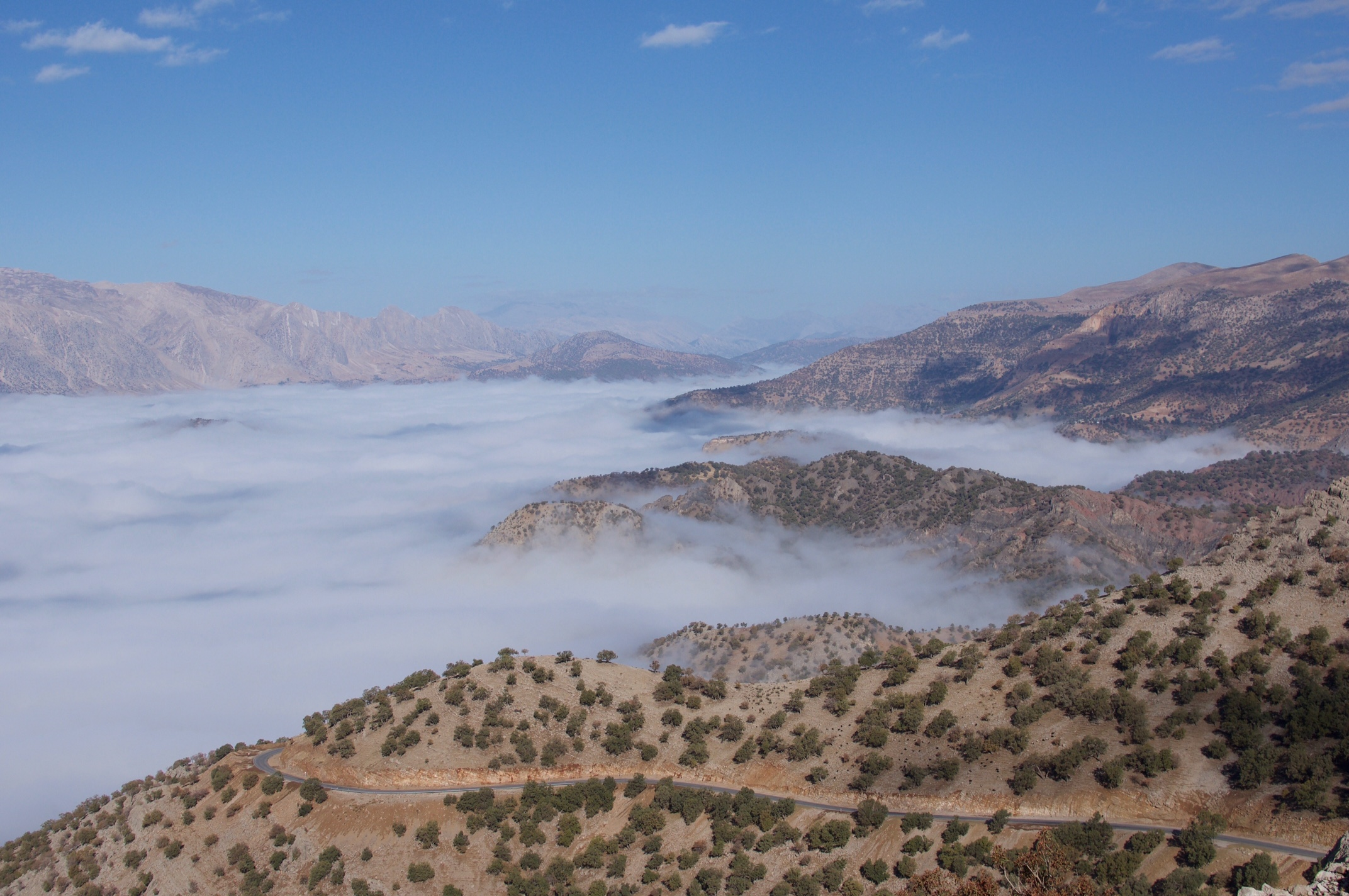
Bazoft valley under a heavy fog

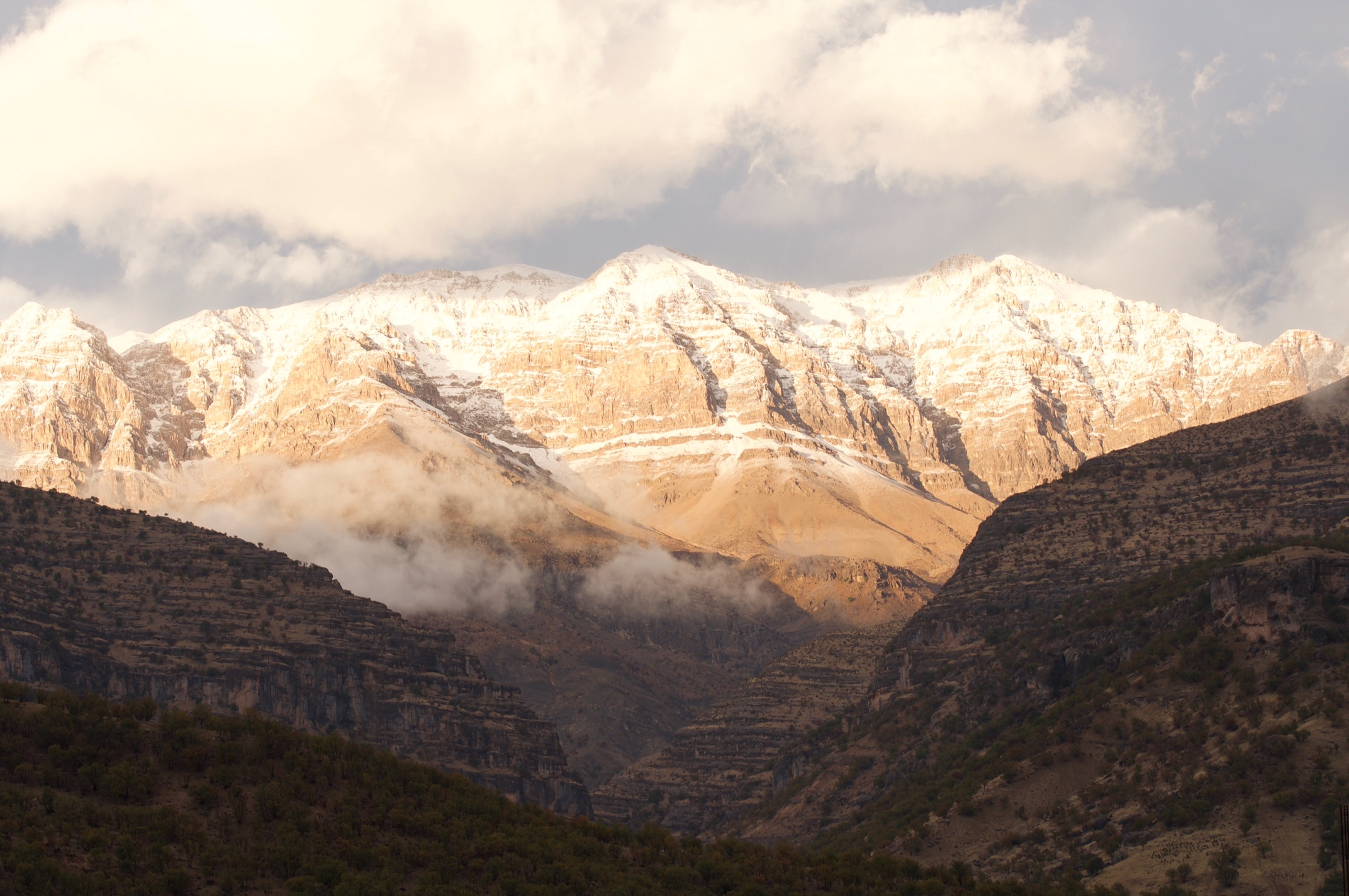
Zard Kuh mountains from the city of Bazoft

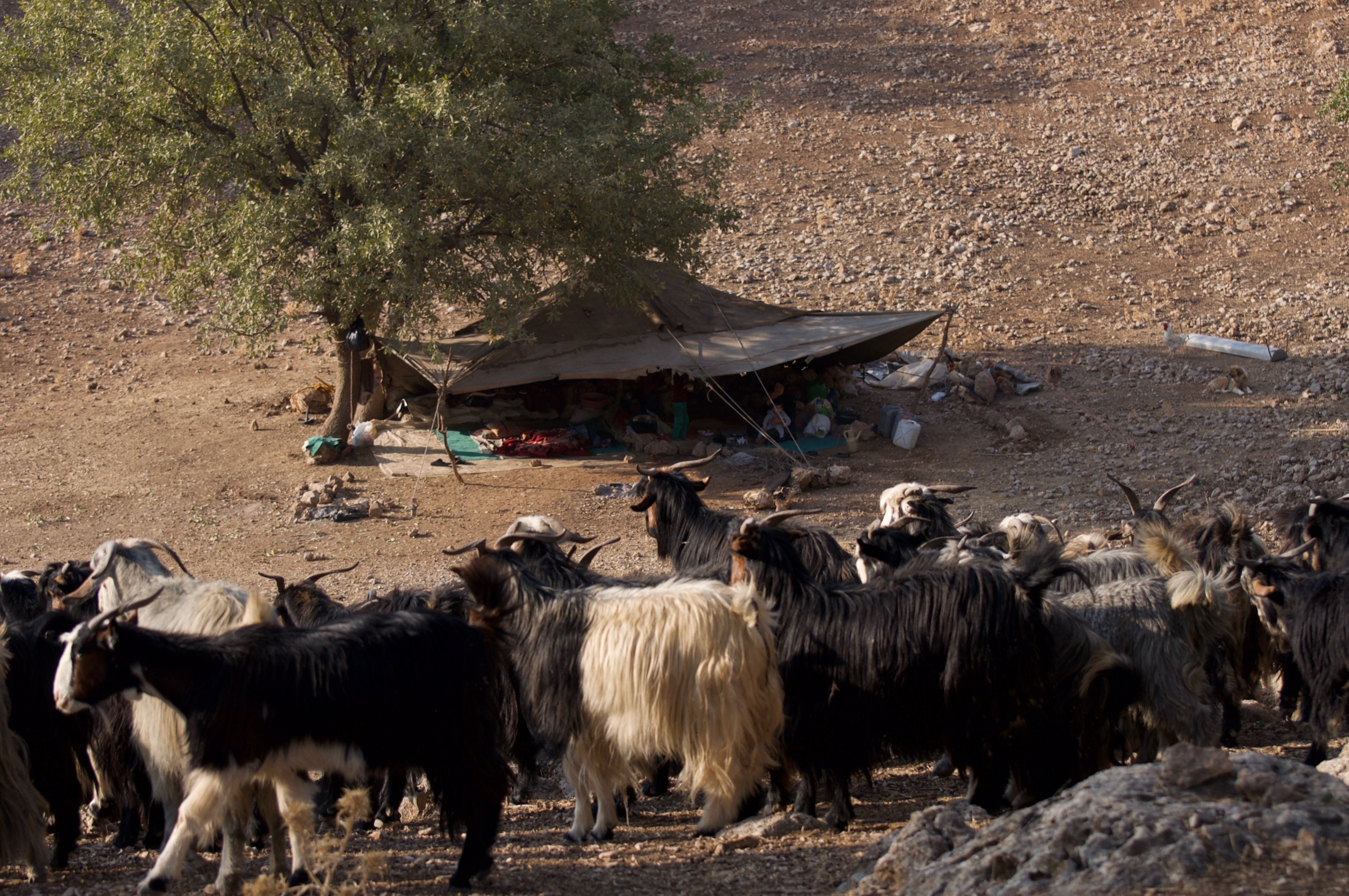
Bakhtiari nomads settlement

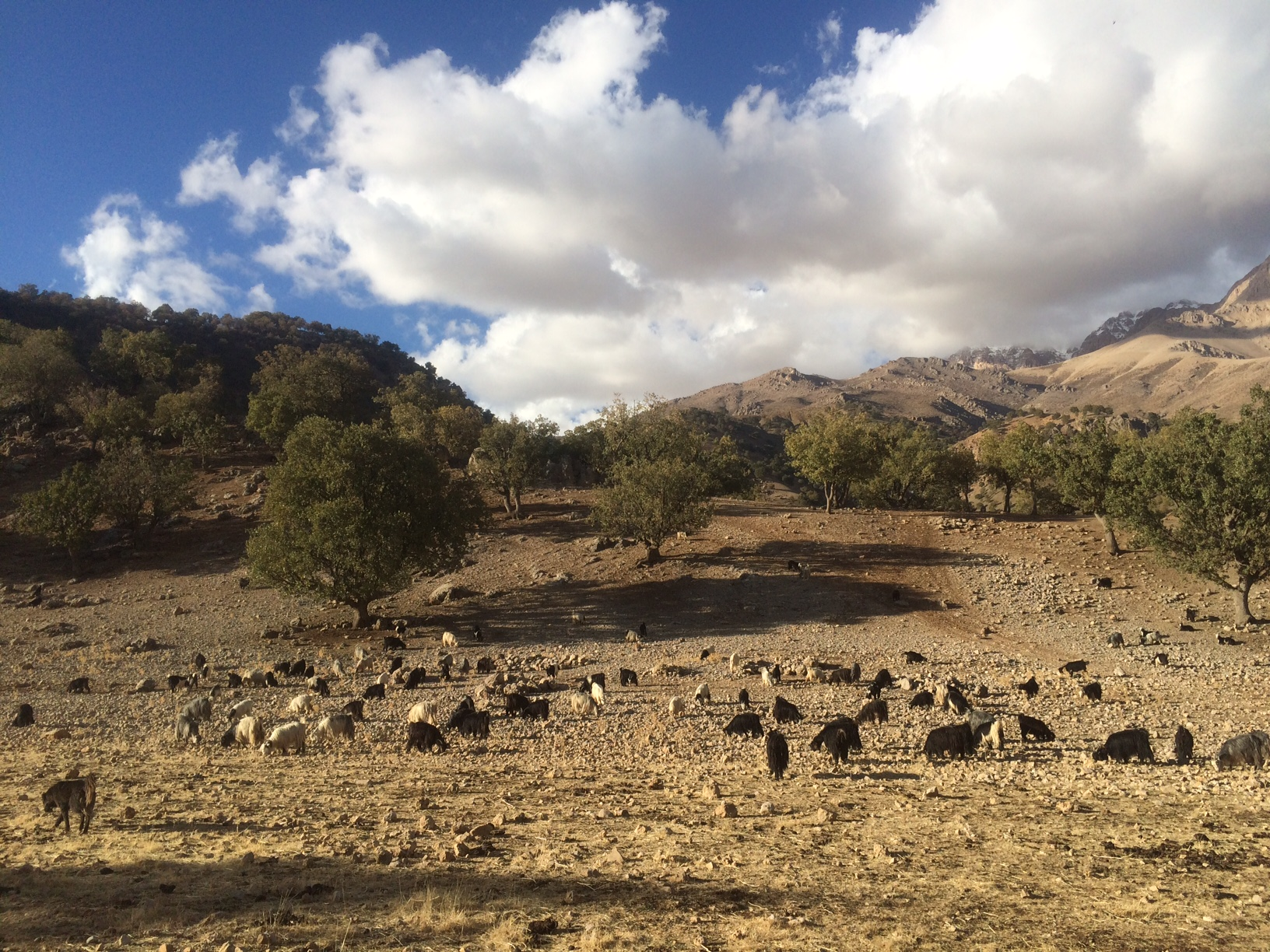
Goats and sheep in the foothill of Zardkuh

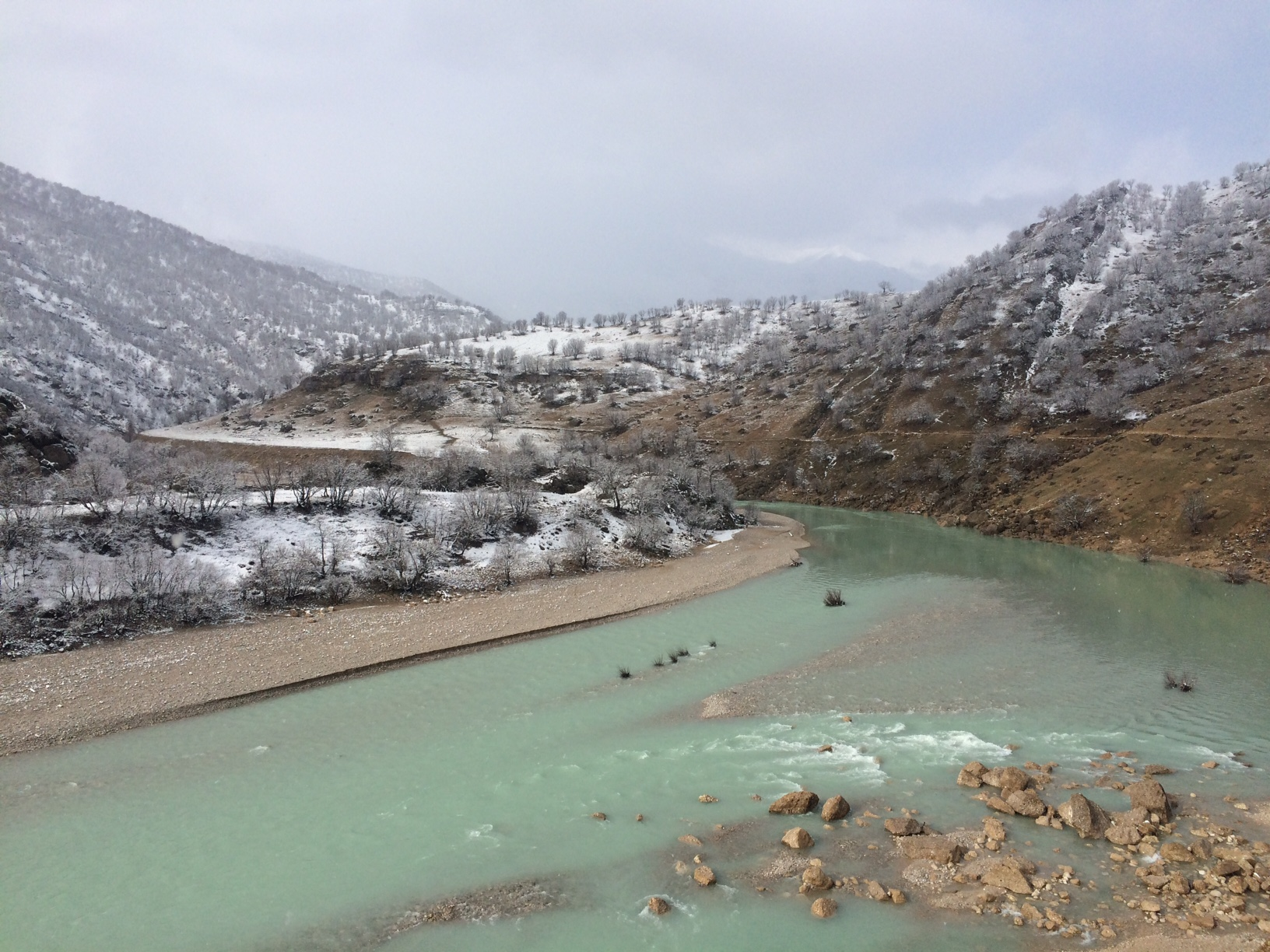
Bazoft river in winter

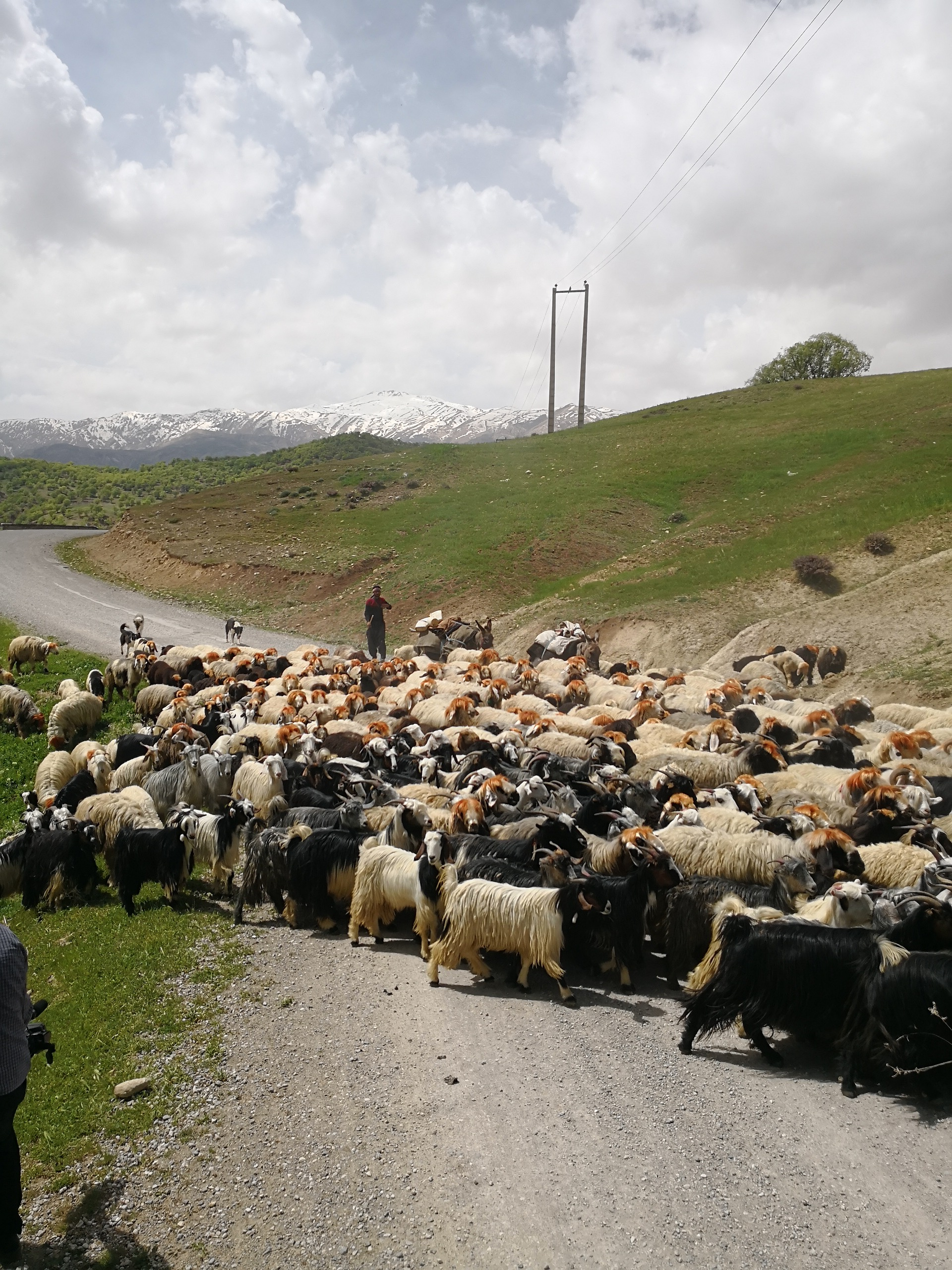
Nomadic transhumance in the village of Hossein Abad
