= Jowzar =

Jowzar or Juzar (Persian: جوزار) may refer to:

- Jowzar-e Bakesh, Fars province
- Jowzar-e Javid, Fars province
- Jowzar, Isfahan
- Jowzar, Kohgiluyeh and Boyer-Ahmad
- Jowzar District, in Fars province
- Jowzar Rural District, in Fars province
