= Qaleh Gar-e Fahlian =

Qaleh Gar-e Fahlian قلعه گرفهليان
- Village
- Location within Iran
- Coordinates: 30°11′17″N 51°31′02″E
- Country: Iran
- Province: Fars
- County: Mamasani
- Bakhsh: Central
- Rural District: Fahlian

Population (2006)
  - Total: 412
- Time zone: UTC+3:30 (IRST)
  - Summer (DST): UTC+4:30 (IRDT)

Qaleh Gar-e Fahlian (Persian: قلعه گرفهليان, also Romanized as Qal‘eh Gar-e Fahlīān; also known as Gar-e Fahlīān, Qal‘eh Gar, Qal‘eh-ye Gar, Qal‘eh-ye Gardaneh, and Qal’eh-ye Gardū) is a village in Fahlian Rural District, in the Central District of Mamasani County, Fars province, Iran. At the 2006 census, its population was 412, in 97 families.
