= Ehengah =

Ehengah اهنگاه
- Village
- Location within Iran
- Coordinates: 30°00′14″N 51°37′27″E
- Country: Iran
- Province: Fars
- County: Mamasani
- Bakhsh: Central
- Rural District: Bakesh-e Yek

Population (2006)
  - Total: 25
- Time zone: UTC+3:30 (IRST)
  - Summer (DST): UTC+4:30 (IRDT)

Ehengah (Persian: اهنگاه, also Romanized as Ehengāh) is a village in Bakesh-e Yek Rural District, in the Central District of Mamasani County, Fars province, Iran. At the 2006 census, its population was 25, in 5 families.
