= Shulestan =

Historical region around Fars in southern Iran

Shulestan (Persian: شولستان, "land of the Shul") was a historic region around Fars in southern Iran. The Shul were later displaced and the region was conquered by the Mamasani and mainly became the Mamasani County, while the Shul had disappeared by the Safavid or Afsharid period.

== History ==
In the Sasanid period, the district of Shulestan was included in the "kura" of Shapur-khura, and its capital, Nawbandagan (Nawbanjan) was founded by Shapur I. It was an important town situated on the road from Fars to Khuzestan, and was taken by Uthman ibn Abi al-As in 643, and was later frequently mentioned by Arab historians and geographers. Water systems in the district included the river system which finally forms the Zohra river, which flowed through Zaydun and Hindiyan. The old Fars-nama referred to the river of Nawbandagan as the Khwabdan river. It was well detailed in Farsnama-ye Naseri, and the main water-course came from the direction of Ardakan and was later called Ab-i Fahliyan or Ab-i Shur.

The Farsnama composed in the lifetime of the Atabeg Chawuli in the early 12th century did not mention the term Shulestan. The tribe at first inhabited Luristan, and around half of the region was under their rule around 912. The leader of the Shul at the time was Sayf al-Din Makan Ruzbihani, whose ancestors had governed the region since the Sassanid period. The Ruzbihani were mentioned as a Lur tribe. At the same time, Hamdallah Mustawfi mentioned a leader of the Shul named Najm al-Din. Historical sources mentioned that from 1106, Kurds and others from Jabal al-Sumaq in Syria began to move into Luristan, and eventually established the Hazaraspid dynasty. Under the Atabeg Hazarasp, the Shul were driven into Fars. Before migrating to Shulestan, the Mamasani had earlier migrated to Luristan around 1203-04. After taking Shulestan, Hazarasp built villages and established colonies, and while it could have attracted some Mamasani in the early 13th century, most sources indicated that the Mamasani migrated much later. After being expelled by Hazarasp, the Shul settled in a region of Fars which became known as Shulestan, centered around Nawbandagan, where its ruins later became Nurabad-e Mamasani. The fortress of Qal'e-ye Sefid was also located in Shulestan.

Marco Polo mentioned "Suolestan" among the "eight kingdoms" of Persia, possibly referring to the new territory around Nawbandagan occupied by the Shul. Bret-schneider studied an ancient Chinese map which included "She-la-tsz'" between Shiraz and Kazerun, possibly referring to Shulestan. Although the Muslim historians generally were ignorant of the Shul, the Shul had a hereditary dynasty at the time of Hamdallah Mustawfi, descended from Najm al-Din Akbar. A new administrative center had replaced Nawbandagan, during the campaign of 1393, Timur halted at Malamir-i Shul ("the estates" of the Amir of the Shul, distinct from the other "Malamir" which referred to Izaj). It was located between two water-courses, and later corresponded to Fahliyan.

The Shul were generally seen as a distinct ethnic group. Sharafkhan Bidlisi had only incidentally mentioned the Shul, perhaps because he excluded them from his category of Kurds. Ibn Battuta, who met with the Shul on several occasions, called them "a Persian tribe (min al-a'ajim) living the desert and including devout people." The Persian dictionaries mentioned "Shuli" as a peculiar dialect. Ibn Fadlallah al-Umari claimed that the Shul had affinities to the Shabankara. Rashid al-Din, while speaking of the Tatars, who were capable of killing one another "for a few words", compared them to the Kurds, the Shul, and the Franks. In 1220, the Atabeg of Luristan Hazarasp advised Muhammad Khwarazmshah to mobilize 100,000 Lurs, Shul, people of Fars, and Shabankara against the Mongols. Rashid al-Din mentioned the Kurds, Turkomans, and Shul among the valiant defenders of Mosul in 1260. Ibn Fadlallah al-Umari divided the Zagros into four nations, the Kurds, Lurs, Shul, and Shabankara.

As they were established on a great road, the Shul were exposed to invasions. The Atabeg of Luristan Yusuf Shah, who ruled from 1274 to 1288, attacked the Shul and killed the brother of their chief Najm al-Din, while in 1354, the Muzaffarid Shah Shuja chastised the Shul severely when they attacked Shiraz, and in 1394, Umar Shaykh, marching behind his father Timur, on his way pillaged all the unsubdued "Lurs, Kurds and Shul". The main causes for the dispersion, assimilation, and final absorption of the Shul were seen as their nomadic state and warlike character, the similarity of their speech to Persian, and the inroads of their neighbors. The only traces of the Shul were found in the toponomy of Fars, where there were several villages around Shiraz and Bushehr with Shul as an element of their names.

During the late Safavid or early Afsharid period, Shulestan was occupied by the Mamasani Lurs, and afterwards the district of Shulestan became the district of Mamasani. By that time, the boundaries of Mamasani to the east were Kamfiruz and Ardakan, to the north and west were Razgird and the Kuhgilu, to the south were Kazerun and the mountain of Marra-Shigift (the northern slopes of the Marwak in Dasht-e Arzhan).
