= Tang Sa =

Tang Sa تنگ سا
- Village
- Location within Iran
- Coordinates: 30°15′24″N 51°41′51″E
- Country: Iran
- Province: Fars
- County: Mamasani
- Bakhsh: Central
- Rural District: Jowzar

Population (2006)
  - Total: 194
- Time zone: UTC+3:30 (IRST)
  - Summer (DST): UTC+4:30 (IRDT)

Tang Sa (Persian: تنگ سا, also Romanized as Tang Sā) is a village in Jowzar Rural District, in the Central District of Mamasani County, Fars province, Iran. At the 2006 census, its population was 194, in 43 families.
