= Deh Gerdu, Mamasani =

Village in Fars province, Iran

Deh Gerdu Persian: ده گردو
- Village
- Location within Iran
- Coordinates: 30°21′05″N 51°40′41″E
- Country: Iran
- Province: Fars
- County: Mamasani
- District: Jowzar
- Rural District: Pereshkaft

Population (2016)
  - Total: 352
- Time zone: UTC+3:30 (IRST)

Deh Gerdu (Persian: ده گردو) (Note: Also romanized as Deh Gerdū and Dehgerdū) is a village in, and the capital of, Pereshkaft Rural District of Jowzar District, Mamasani County, Fars province, Iran.

== Demographics ==
=== Population ===
At the time of the 2006 National Census, the village's population was 349 in 79 households, when it was in Jowzar Rural District of the Central District. The following census in 2011 counted 420 people in 109 households. The 2016 census measured the population of the village as 352 people in 107 households.

In 2019, the rural district was separated from the district in the formation of Jowzar District. Deh Gerdu was transferred to Pereshkaft Rural District created in the new district.
