= Rejalu =

Rejalu رجالو
- Village
- Location within Iran
- Coordinates: 30°17′36″N 51°37′19″E
- Country: Iran
- Province: Fars
- County: Mamasani
- Bakhsh: Central
- Rural District: Jowzar

Population (2006)
  - Total: 47
- Time zone: UTC+3:30 (IRST)
  - Summer (DST): UTC+4:30 (IRDT)

Rejalu (Persian: رجالو, also Romanized as Rejālū) is a village in Jowzar Rural District, in the Central District of Mamasani County, Fars province, Iran. At the 2006 census, its population was 47, in 8 families.
