= Deh Gerdu =

Deh Gerdu or Dehgerdu (Persian: ده گردو) may refer to:

- Galgun (disambiguation), Fars province
- Deh Gerdu, Mamasani, Fars province
- Deh Gerdu, Kerman
