= Kherengan =

Kherengan خرنگان
- Village
- Location within Iran
- Coordinates: 30°18′03″N 51°37′04″E
- Country: Iran
- Province: Fars
- County: Mamasani
- Bakhsh: Central
- Rural District: Jowzar

Population (2006)
  - Total: 49
- Time zone: UTC+3:30 (IRST)
  - Summer (DST): UTC+4:30 (IRDT)

Kherengan (Persian: خرنگان, also Romanized as Kherengān; also known as Kherengūn) is a village in Jowzar Rural District, in the Central District of Mamasani County, Fars province, Iran. At the 2006 census, its population was 49, in 16 families.
