= Mal Hajji =

Mal Hajji مال حاجي
- Village
- Location within Iran
- Coordinates: 30°10′38″N 51°44′53″E
- Country: Iran
- Province: Fars
- County: Mamasani
- Bakhsh: Central
- Rural District: Jowzar

Population (2006)
  - Total: 153
- Time zone: UTC+3:30 (IRST)
  - Summer (DST): UTC+4:30 (IRDT)

Mal Hajji (Persian: مال حاجي, also Romanized as Māl Ḩājjī) is a village in Jowzar Rural District, in the Central District of Mamasani County, Fars province, Iran. At the 2006 census, its population was 153, in 36 families.
