= Tall Rizi-ye Alivand =

Tall Rizi-ye Alivand تل ريزي عاليوند
- Village
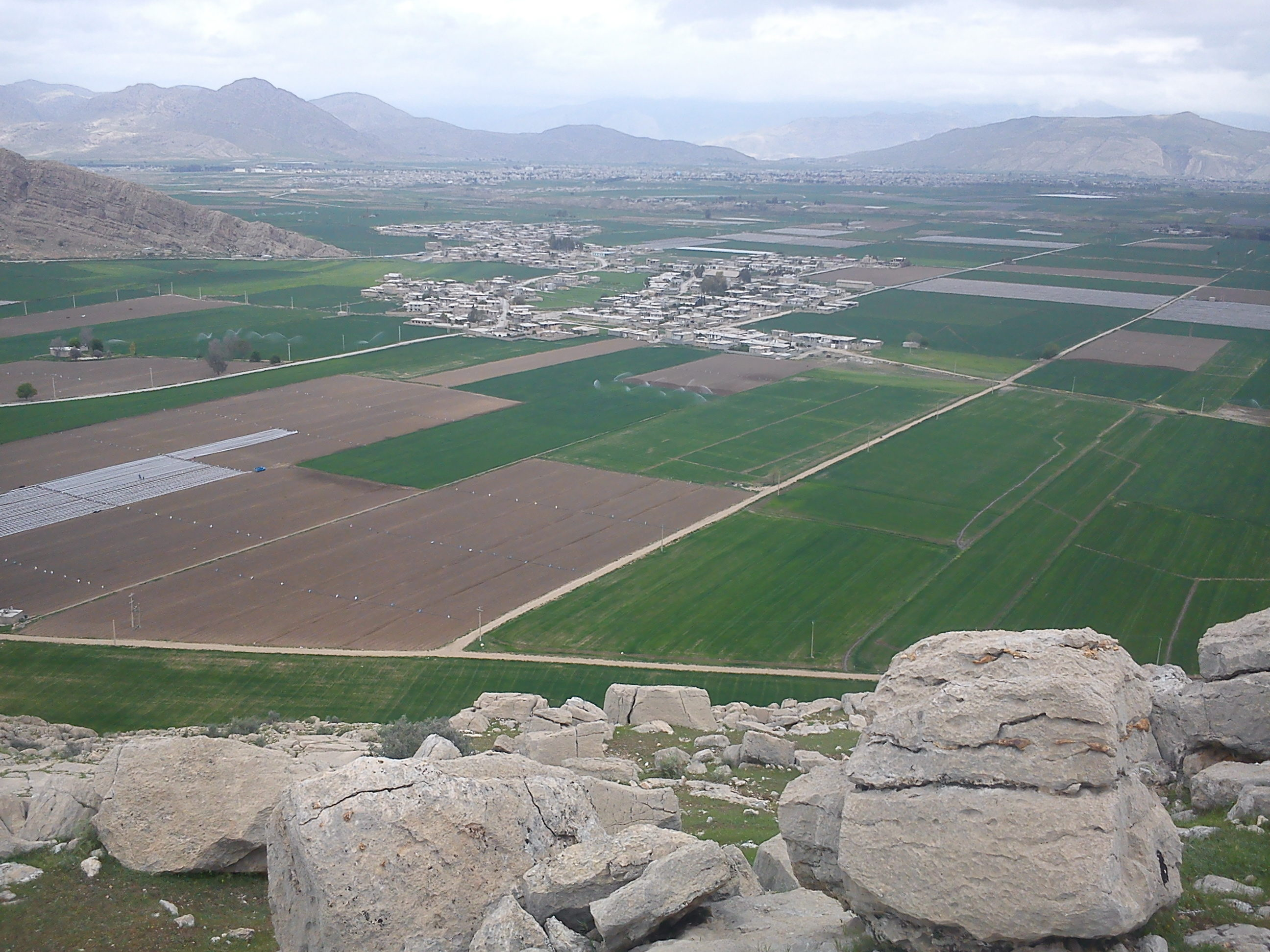

- Location within Iran
- Coordinates: 30°05′04″N 51°30′36″E
- Country: Iran
- Province: Fars
- County: Mamasani
- Bakhsh: Central
- Rural District: Bakesh-e Yek

Population (2006)
  - Total: 402
- Time zone: UTC+3:30 (IRST)
  - Summer (DST): UTC+4:30 (IRDT)

Tall Rizi-ye Alivand (Persian: تل ريزي عاليوند, also Romanized as Tall Rīzī-ye 'Ālīvand and Tol Rīzī-ye 'Ālīvand; also known as Tall Rīzī) is a village in Bakesh-e Yek Rural District, in the Central District of Mamasani County, Fars province, Iran. At the 2006 census, its population was 402, in 82 families.
