= Abgasht-e Madui =

Abgasht-e Madui ابگشت مدوئي
- Village
- Country: Iran
- Province: Fars
- County: Mamasani
- Bakhsh: Central
- Rural District: Bakesh-e Yek

Population (2006)
  - Total: 464
- Time zone: UTC+3:30 (IRST)
  - Summer (DST): UTC+4:30 (IRDT)

Abgasht-e Madui (Persian: ابگشت مدوئي, also Romanized as Ābgasht-e Madū’ī) is a village in Bakesh-e Yek Rural District, in the Central District of Mamasani County, Fars province, Iran. At the 2006 census, its population was 464, in 104 families.
