= Qaleh-ye Piru =

Qaleh-ye Piru قلعه پيرو
- Village
- Location within Iran
- Coordinates: 30°04′37″N 51°30′35″E
- Country: Iran
- Province: Fars
- County: Mamasani
- Bakhsh: Central
- Rural District: Bakesh-e Yek

Population (2006)
  - Total: 639
- Time zone: UTC+3:30 (IRST)
  - Summer (DST): UTC+4:30 (IRDT)

Qaleh-ye Piru (Persian: قلعه پيرو, also Romanized as Qal‘eh-ye Pīrū and Qal‘eh Pīrū) is a village in Bakesh-e Yek Rural District, in the Central District of Mamasani County, Fars province, Iran. At the 2006 census, its population was 639, in 134 families.
