= Fahlian =

Fahlian or Fehlian or Fahleyan (Persian: فهليان), also rendered as Faleyun, may refer to:

- Fahlian-e Olya
- Fahlian-e Sofla
- Fahlian Rural District
