= Harar-e Kalgah-e Shiraz =

Harar-e Kalgah-e Shiraz حراركلگاه شيراز
- Village
- Location within Iran
- Coordinates: 30°00′36″N 51°46′48″E
- Country: Iran
- Province: Fars
- County: Mamasani
- Bakhsh: Central
- Rural District: Bakesh-e Yek

Population (2006)
  - Total: 22
- Time zone: UTC+3:30 (IRST)
  - Summer (DST): UTC+4:30 (IRDT)

Harar-e Kalgah-e Shiraz (Persian: حراركلگاه شيراز, also Romanized as Ḩarār-e Kalgāh-e Shīrāz; also known as Ḩarāreh Kalgāh-e Shīrāz) is a village in Bakesh-e Yek Rural District, in the Central District of Mamasani County, Fars province, Iran. At the 2006 census, its population was 22, in 7 families.
