= Tol-e Meshkin =

Tol-e Meshkin تل مشكين
- Village
- Location within Iran
- Coordinates: 30°04′03″N 51°27′24″E
- Country: Iran
- Province: Fars
- County: Mamasani
- Bakhsh: Central
- Rural District: Bakesh-e Yek

Population (2006)
  - Total: 245
- Time zone: UTC+3:30 (IRST)
  - Summer (DST): UTC+4:30 (IRDT)

Tol-e Meshkin (Persian: تل مشكين, also Romanized as Tol-e Meshkīn; also known as Tol-e Meshgī) is a village in Bakesh-e Yek Rural District, in the Central District of Mamasani County, Fars province, Iran. At the 2006 census, its population was 245, in 51 families.
