= Harariz =

Harariz هرايرز
- Village
- Location within Iran
- Coordinates: 30°00′18″N 51°36′15″E
- Country: Iran
- Province: Fars
- County: Mamasani
- Bakhsh: Central
- Rural District: Bakesh-e Yek

Population (2006)
  - Total: 24
- Time zone: UTC+3:30 (IRST)
  - Summer (DST): UTC+4:30 (IRDT)

Harariz (Persian: هرايرز, also Romanized as Harārīz; also known as Harāyrez) is a village in Bakesh-e Yek Rural District, in the Central District of Mamasani County, Fars province, Iran. At the 2006 census, its population was 24, in 6 families.

In the year 1395, the harayraz Monograph Book was published by Sasan Moaddab of the Hararez Youth and in collaboration with Dr. Suleiman Heidari, a professor at Shiraz University. This book examines the history, natural and human geography of the region and the customs of the people of Guinea.
