= Dasht-e Razm-e Olya =

Dasht-e Razm-e Olya دشت رزم عليا
- Village
- Location within Iran
- Coordinates: 30°10′00″N 51°35′00″E
- Country: Iran
- Province: Fars
- County: Mamasani
- Bakhsh: Central
- Rural District: Javid-e Mahuri

Population (2006)
  - Total: 472
- Time zone: UTC+3:30 (IRST)
  - Summer (DST): UTC+4:30 (IRDT)

Dasht-e Razm-e Olya (Persian: دشت رزم عليا, also Romanized as Dasht-e Razm-e 'Olyā; also known as Dasht-e Razm-e Khalīfeh Hārūn) is a village in Javid-e Mahuri Rural District, in the Central District of Mamasani County, Fars province, Iran. At the 2006 census, its population was 472, in 104 families.
