= Muraki, Fars =

Village in Fars province, Iran

Muraki Persian: موركي
- Village
- Location within Iran
- Coordinates: 30°09′57″N 51°33′33″E
- Country: Iran
- Province: Fars
- County: Mamasani
- District: Central
- Rural District: Javid-e Mahuri

Population (2016)
  - Total: 1,893
- Time zone: UTC+3:30 (IRST)

Muraki (Persian: موركي) (Note: Also romanized as Mūrakī) is a village in, and the capital of, Javid-e Mahuri Rural District of the Central District of Mamasani County, Fars province, Iran.

== Demographics ==
=== Population ===
At the time of the 2006 National Census, the village's population was 1,796 in 371 households. The following census in 2011 counted 1,875 people in 513 households. The 2016 census measured the population of the village as 1,893 people in 569 households. It was the most populous village in its rural district.
