= Pereshkaft Rural District =

Rural district in Fars province, Iran

Pereshkaft Rural District Persian: دهستان پراشکفت
- Rural District
- Location within Iran
- Coordinates: 30°20′54″N 51°42′43″E
- Country: Iran
- Province: Fars
- County: Mamasani
- District: Jowzar
- Capital: Deh Gerdu
- Time zone: UTC+3:30 (IRST)

Pereshkaft Rural District (Persian: دهستان پراشکفت) is in Jowzar District of Mamasani County, Fars province, Iran. Its capital is the village of Deh Gerdu, whose population at the time of the National Census of 2016 was 352 in 107 households.

== History ==
In 2019, Jowzar Rural District was separated from the Central District in the formation of Jowzar District, and Pereshkaft Rural District was established in the new district.
