= Tol-e Khandaq =

Tol-e Khandaq (Persian: تل خندق), also known as Tol-e Jandaq, may refer to:

- Tol-e Khandaq-e Olya
- Tol-e Khandaq-e Sofla
