= Dasht-e Razm =

Dasht-e Razm (Persian: دشت رزم) may refer to:

- Dasht-e Razm-e Musa Arabi
- Dasht-e Razm-e Olya
