= Ali Shahi, Fars =

Ali Shahi عليشاهي
- Village
- Location within Iran
- Coordinates: 30°16′21″N 51°40′14″E
- Country: Iran
- Province: Fars
- County: Mamasani
- Bakhsh: Central
- Rural District: Jowzar

Population (2006)
  - Total: 275
- Time zone: UTC+3:30 (IRST)
  - Summer (DST): UTC+4:30 (IRDT)

Ali Shahi (Persian: عليشاهي, also Romanized as Ālī Shāhī) is a village in Jowzar Rural District, in the Central District of Mamasani County, Fars province, Iran. At the 2006 census, its population was 275, in 66 families.
