= Jowzar-e Bakesh =

Village in Iran

Jowzar-e Bakesh جوزاربكش
- Village
- Location within Iran
- Coordinates: 30°19′01″N 51°36′44″E
- Country: Iran
- Province: Fars
- County: Mamasani
- Bakhsh: Central
- Rural District: Jowzar

Population (2006)
  - Total: 803
- Time zone: UTC+3:30 (IRST)
  - Summer (DST): UTC+4:30 (IRDT)

Jowzar-e Bakesh (Persian: جوزاربكش, also Romanized as Jowzār-e Bakesh and Jūzār Bakesh) is a village in Jowzar Rural District, in the Central District of Mamasani County, Fars province, Iran. At the 2006 census, its population was 803, in 151 families.
