= Alishahi =

Alishahi or Ali Shahi (Persian: عليشاهي) may refer to:

- Ali Shahi, Fars
- Alishahi, Kerman
