= Guyim, Mamasani =

Guyim گويم
- Village
- Location within Iran
- Coordinates: 30°20′41″N 51°36′50″E
- Country: Iran
- Province: Fars
- County: Mamasani
- Bakhsh: Central
- Rural District: Jowzar

Population (2006)
  - Total: 204
- Time zone: UTC+3:30 (IRST)
  - Summer (DST): UTC+4:30 (IRDT)

Guyim (Persian: گويم, also Romanized as Gūyīm; also known as Gūyem-e Pā’īn and Gūyem-e Soflá) is a village in Jowzar Rural District, in the Central District of Mamasani County, Fars province, Iran. At the 2006 census, its population was 204, in 46 families.
