= Gachgaran =

Village in Fars province, Iran

Gachgaran Persian: گچگران
- Village
- Location within Iran
- Coordinates: 30°05′08″N 51°32′11″E
- Country: Iran
- Province: Fars
- County: Mamasani
- District: Central
- Rural District: Bakesh-e Yek

Population (2016)
  - Total: 1,488
- Time zone: UTC+3:30 (IRST)

Gachgaran (Persian: گچگران) (Note: Also romanized as Gachgarān; also known as Qal‘eh Gach Gīrān, Qal‘eh-e Chāh Gīrān, and Qal‘eh-ye Kajgīrān) is a village in, and the capital of, Bakesh-e Yek Rural District of the Central District of Mamasani County, Fars province, Iran.

== Demographics ==
=== Population ===
At the time of the 2006 National Census, the village's population was 1,158 in 255 households. The following census in 2011 counted 1,235 people in 341 households. The 2016 census measured the population of the village as 1,488 people in 467 households. It was the most populous village in its rural district.
