= Mehrenjan, Mamasani =

Village in Fars province, Iran

Mehrenjan Persian: مهرنجان
- Village
- Location within Iran
- Coordinates: 30°13′44″N 51°42′38″E
- Country: Iran
- Province: Fars
- County: Mamasani
- District: Jowzar
- Rural District: Jowzar

Population (2016)
  - Total: 1,508
- Time zone: UTC+3:30 (IRST)

Mehrenjan (Persian: مهرنجان) (Note: Also romanized as Mehrenjān; also known as Kūrā) is a village in Jowzar Rural District of Jowzar District, Mamasani County, Fars province, Iran, serving as capital of both the district and the rural district.

== Demographics ==
=== Population ===
At the time of the 2006 National Census, the village's population was 1,543 in 430 households, when it was in the Central District. The following census in 2011 counted 1,286 people in 422 households. The 2016 census measured the population of the village as 1,508 people in 525 households. It was the most populous village in its rural district.

In 2019, the rural district was separated from the district in the formation of Jowzar District.
