= Galkun =

Galkun گلكون
- Village
- Location within Iran
- Coordinates: 29°55′57″N 51°35′46″E
- Country: Iran
- Province: Fars
- County: Mamasani
- Bakhsh: Central
- Rural District: Bakesh-e Yek

Population (2006)
  - Total: 799
- Time zone: UTC+3:30 (IRST)
  - Summer (DST): UTC+4:30 (IRDT)

Galkun (Persian: گلكون, also Romanized as Galkūn; also known as Deh Gerdū, Galgūn, Galugan, and Golgān) is a village in Bakesh-e Yek Rural District, in the Central District of Mamasani County, Fars province, Iran. At the 2006 census, its population was 799, in 153 families.
