= Tol-e Khandaq-e Sofla =

Village in Fars, Iran

Tol-e Khandaq-e Sofla تل خندق سفلي
- Village
- Location within Iran
- Coordinates: 30°01′42″N 51°29′53″E
- Country: Iran
- Province: Fars
- County: Mamasani
- Bakhsh: Central
- Rural District: Bakesh-e Yek

Population (2006)
  - Total: 47
- Time zone: UTC+3:30 (IRST)
  - Summer (DST): UTC+4:30 (IRDT)

Tol-e Khandaq-e Sofla (Persian: تل خندق سفلي, also Romanized as Tol-e Khandaq-e Soflá; also known as Tol-e Jandaq and Tol-e Khandaq) is a village in Bakesh-e Yek Rural District, in the Central District of Mamasani County, Fars province, Iran. At the 2006 census, its population was 47, in 9 families.
