= Dasht-e Razm-e Musa Arabi =

Dasht-e Razm-e Musa Arabi دشت رزم موسي عربي
- Village
- Location within Iran
- Coordinates: 30°10′23″N 51°34′42″E
- Country: Iran
- Province: Fars
- County: Mamasani
- Bakhsh: Central
- Rural District: Javid-e Mahuri

Population (2006)
  - Total: 1,003
- Time zone: UTC+3:30 (IRST)
  - Summer (DST): UTC+4:30 (IRDT)

Dasht-e Razm-e Musa Arabi (Persian: دشت رزم موسي عربي, also Romanized as Dasht-e Razm-e Mūsá 'Arabī; also known as Dasht-e Razm and Dasht-e Zarm) is a village in Javid-e Mahuri Rural District, in the Central District of Mamasani County, Fars province, Iran. In the 2006 census, its population was 1,003, in 211 families.
