= Tol-e Khandaq-e Olya =

Tol-e Khandaq-e Olya تل خندق عليا
- Village
- Location within Iran
- Coordinates: 30°01′42″N 51°29′53″E
- Country: Iran
- Province: Fars
- County: Mamasani
- Bakhsh: Central
- Rural District: Bakesh-e Yek

Population (2006)
  - Total: 173
- Time zone: UTC+3:30 (IRST)
  - Summer (DST): UTC+4:30 (IRDT)

Tol-e Khandaq-e Olya (Persian: تل خندق عليا, also Romanized as Tol-e Khandaq-e 'Olyā; also known as Tol-e Jandaq and Tol-e Khandaq) is a village in Bakesh-e Yek Rural District, in the Central District of Mamasani County, Fars province, Iran. At the 2006 census, its population was 173, in 38 families.
