= Arme Construction Company =

Iranian construction company

- Company type: Corporation
- Industry: Construction
- Founded: Tehran, Tehran, Iran (1946)
- Founder: Amir Malekyazdi
- Area served: International
- Key people: Amir Malekyazdi (Malekzadeh)
- Services: Construction, Building Services/MEP Engineering, Structural Engineering, Civil Engineering, Sustainable Design and Urban Design & Planning

Arme Construction Company has been one of Iran's and the Middle East's largest construction companies.

The company has built numerous civic and infrastructure projects including roads, bridges, tunnels, airports, townships, and an Asian Games Sports Complex in Tehran, including the 105,000 seat Azadi Stadium, indoor Olympic Swimming Pool, Velodrome, Olympic Village and a man-made lake, all designed by Skidmore, Owings & Merrill of Chicago and Abdol-Aziz Farmanfarmaian and Associates Architects, and all built with a future Tehran Olympic Games in mind.

Arme and its subsidiaries and affiliates including Parc des Princes Co, Vanak Park Co, Kamsaz Co, Paziran Co, were also responsible for building some of the Middle East's private real estate development projects including the 200,000 sq. metre Parc des Princes and Vanak Park high rise communities and office buildings in Tehran.

== History ==
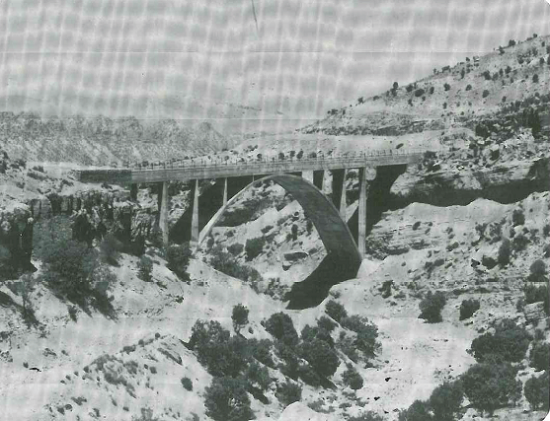
Shiraz-Bushehr Road Bridge

Arme was founded in 1946 by Iranian entrepreneur Amir Malekyazdi.

== Projects ==
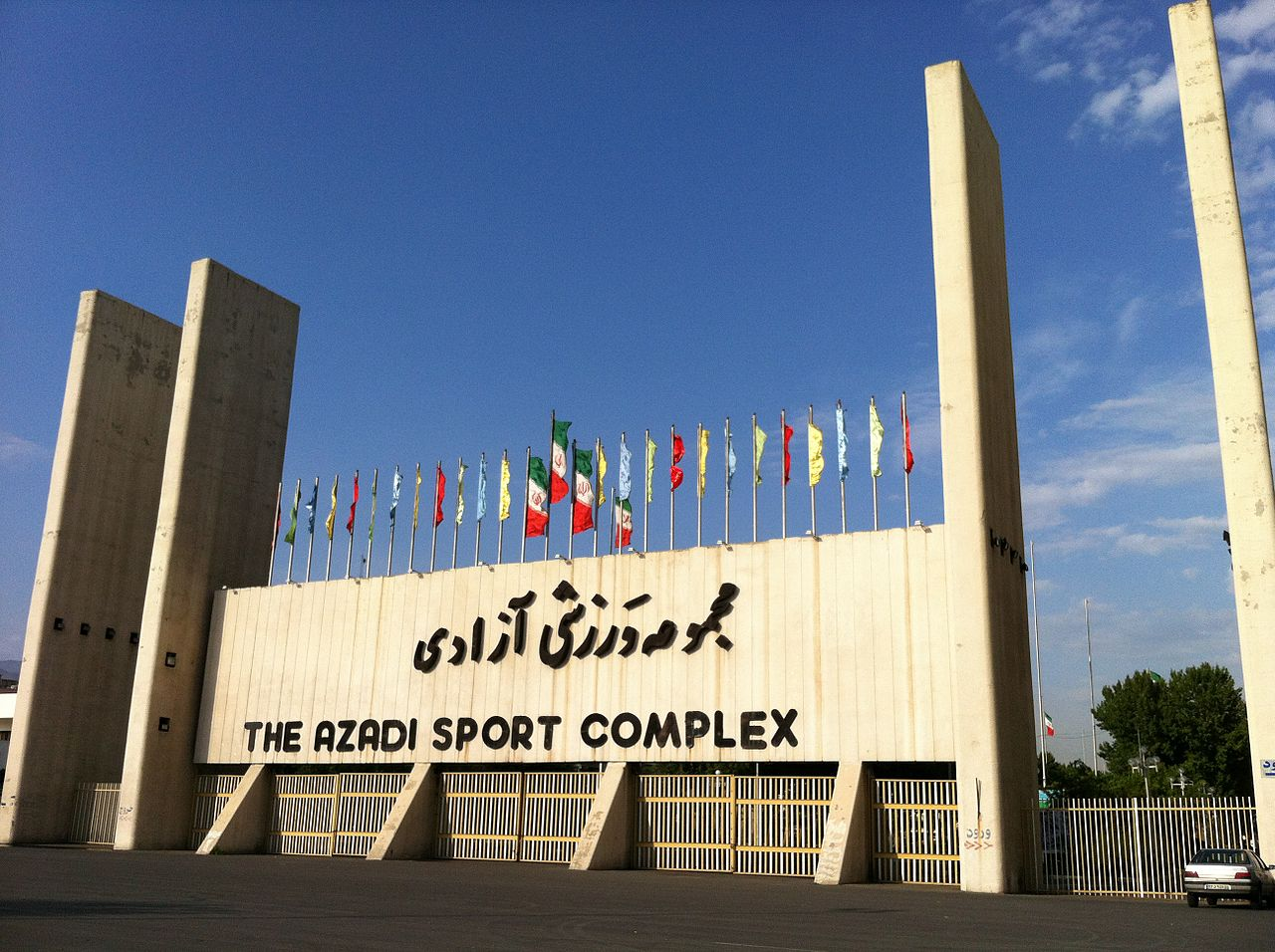
Azadi Sport Complex

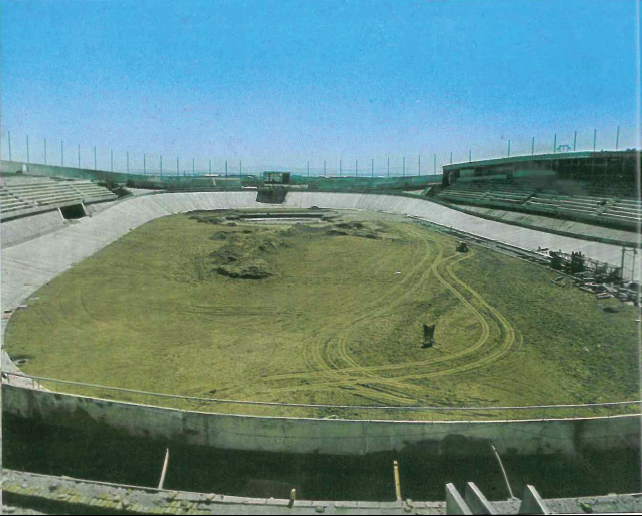
Velodrome under construction

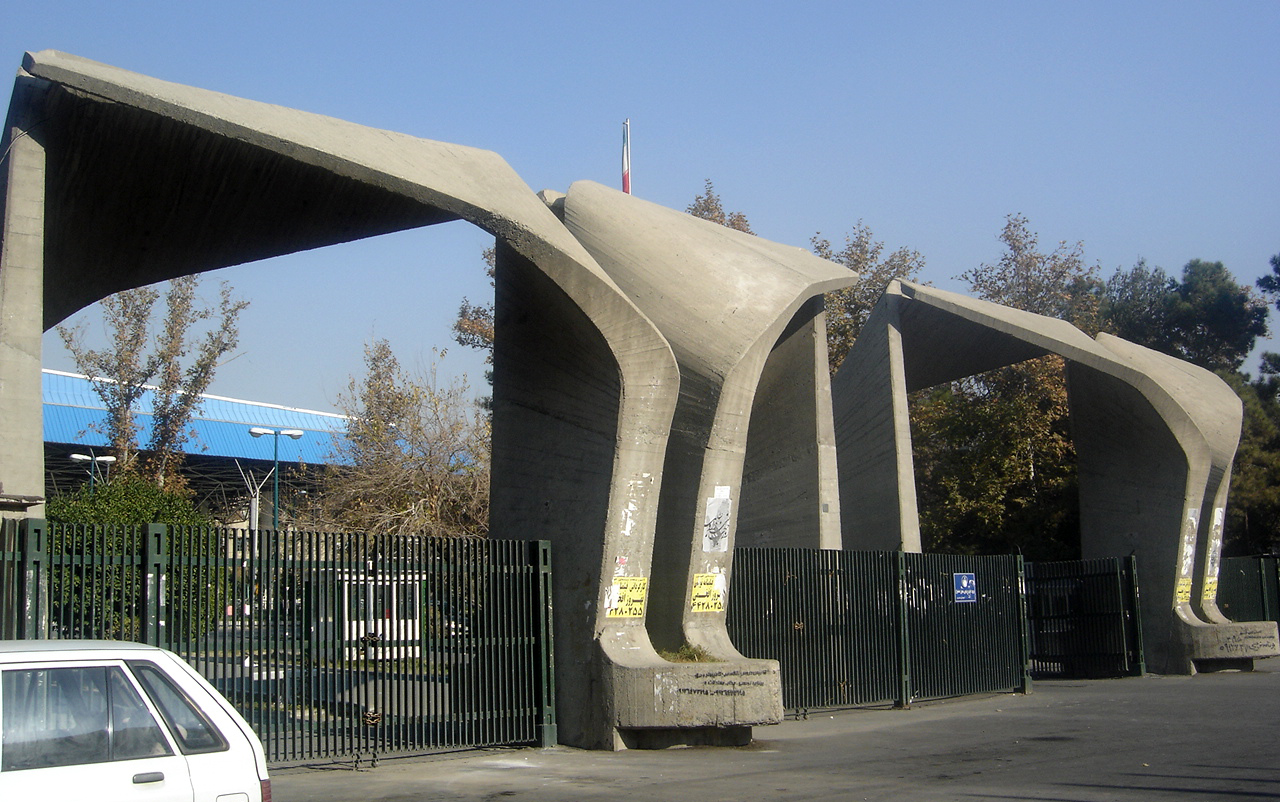
University of Tehran main entrance

The Azadi Sport Complex (formerly Aryamehr Sport Complex). Kan Bridge 1974. Vanak Parkway Overpass 1973. Bridges over Karaj Freeway 1971. Khoy-Rezaieh Road Lots 4,5 and 6 1974. Bandar Abbas-Rudan Road Lot 40, 1966 Shiraz Bushehr road Lot 6/C 1974. Shiraz Bushehr road Lot 2, 1968. Third bridge over the Karoun river 1969. Fourth bridge over the Karoun river 1973. Hafez- Soraya Building 1974 University of Tehran main entrance 1971 Farahanz Noursing School 1974.

Buildings Rezaieh Tobacco Factory warehouses and associated buildings, Rezaieh, 1948. Bank Sepah headquarters building 1972 Shahi Weaving Factory including threading factory, jute manufacturing plant and knitting and weaving mill, Shahi, 1952. Sheetsazi Building and Power Plant, Tehran, 1954. Tehran Maternity Hospital, Tehran, 1958. Government Buildings, Tehran, 1958. Imperial Iranian Air Force Buildings, Hamadan and Dezful Air Bases, 1971. Tehran University Entrance Gates, Tehran, 1971. National Iranian Steel Mill Training School, Isfahan, 1971 Sepah Bank headquarters and office building, Tehran, 1972. Aryamehr Stadium for 100,000 spectators, Tehran, 1972. Hafez-Soraya office building, Tehran, 1973.

Bridges Bandar Abbas-Rudan Road, Bridge, 1967. Third Bridge over the Karoun River, on Khorramshahr Andimeshk-Ahwaz-Sar-Bandar feeder road, 1971 Vanak Parkway Overpass, Tehran, 1971. Fourth Bridge over the Karoun River, Ahwaz, 1973. Bridges on the Shiraz-Bushehr Road, Lot 2,1968 and Lot 6/C. 1973

Roads Hamadan-Khosrovi Highway, lots 2 and 5, 1961. Shahi-Babol Highway, 1963. Bandar Abbas-Rudan Main Road, 1966. Yasuj-Fahlian Feeder Road, 1968. Yasuj-Sisakht Feeder Road, 1970. Khorramabad-Afrineh (Zagheh-Andimeshk) Main Road, 1965 . Gutchan-Shahpassand Highway, lot I, 1971. Tomb of Reza Shah the Great Connecting Road, Tehran, 1971. Khorramshahr-Andimeshk, Ahwaz-Sar Bandar Connecting Road and Karoun river Bridge, 1971. Shiraz-Bushehr Highway, lot 2, 1968.

Other Projects Water canals along the Karaj River, 1960. Procurement of 1,300,000 cubic meters of concrete aggregate for the National Iranian Steel Mill, Isfahan, 1970. Site preparation of three sites for the National Iranian Steel Mill, Isfahan, 1970. Re-surfacing of Hamadan and Dezful Airfields for the Imperial Iranian Air Force, 1971. Relocation of pipelines for the National Iranian Oil Company, Avaj-Andimeshk, 1965 Irrigation canals and works for Dez Irrigation Project, Dezful, 1973.
