= Fahlian-e Sofla =

Neighborhood in Fars province, Iran

Fahlian-e Sofla Persian: فهليان سفلي
- Neighborhood
- Location within Iran
- Coordinates: 30°11′52″N 51°29′54″E
- Country: Iran
- Province: Fars
- County: Mamasani
- District: Central
- Rural District: Fahlian
- Village: Fahlian

Population (2016)
  - Total: 438
- Time zone: UTC+3:30 (IRST)

Fahlian-e Sofla (Persian: فهليان سفلي) (Note: Also romanized as Fahlīān-e Soflá; also known as Fahlīān-e Pā’īn and Shūlestān Qal‘eh Mīrzā Mollā) is a neighborhood in the village of Fahlian in Fahlian Rural District of the Central District in Mamasani County, Fars province, Iran.

== Demographics ==
=== Population ===
At the time of the 2006 National Census, Fahlian-e Sofla's population was 1,120 in 253 households, when it was a village in Fahlian Rural District. The following census in 2011 counted 269 people in 78 households. The 2016 census measured the population of the village as 438 people in 129 households.

After the census, the villages of Fahlian-e Olya and Fahlian-e Sofla were merged to form the village of Fahlian.
