= Guyim =

Guyim (Persian: گويم) may refer to:

- Guyim, Mamasani
- Guyim, Shiraz
