= Amir Malekyazdi =

Iranian-Canadian businessman (1923–2019)

Amir Malekyazdi (Malekzadeh)
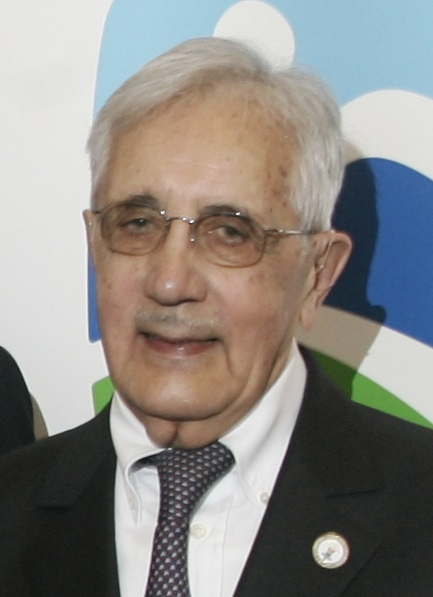
- Born: 23 October 1923; Yazd, Iran
- Died: 6 November 2019 (aged 96); Paris, France
- Education: Berlin Charlottenburg
- Occupations: Entrepreneur, Philanthropist; Chairman & CEO of Arme Construction Company
- Years active: 1946–2019
- Children: S. Peter Malek, Shahram Malek, Marjan, Maryam and Elham

Amir Khan Malekyazdi or Malekzadeh (23 October 1923 – 6 November 2019) was an Iranian-Canadian civil engineer, real-estate developer and builder, and philanthropist based in Vancouver, Canada, and Paris, France.

He started Arme Construction Company, shortly after he graduated from the University of Charlottenburg in Berlin. Arme became one of the largest construction and development companies in Iran and the Middle East having built numerous civic and infrastructure projects including roads, bridges, tunnels, airports, whole townships, and an entire Azadi /Asian Games Sports Complex in Tehran, including a 105,000 seat stadium, indoor Olympic Swimming Pool, Velodrome, Olympic Village and a giant man-made lake, all designed by Skidmore Owings and Merrill of Chicago and A. Farmanfarmaian and Associates Architects, and all built with a future Tehran Olympic Games in mind.

Arme Construction Company and its subsidiaries and affiliates including Parc des Princes Co, Vanak Park Co, Kamsaz Co, Paziran Co, were also responsible for building some of the Middle East's largest private real estate development projects including the 200,000 sq. metre Parc des Princes and Vanak Park high rise communities and various commercial buildings in Tehran, including the Paziran, Pan American Oil Co and Iranian National Railways office buildings.

Abbas Milani, Director of Iranian Studies at Stanford University, in his book 'Eminent Persians' (Syracuse University Press), names Amir Malekyazdi as one of the men and women who made modern Iran.

The family, including brothers S. Peter Malek & Shahram Malek and sisters Marjan, Maryam and Elham, has been active in Canada and France since 1981. Through their companies, Armeco Construction, Belmont Construction, Millennium Development Group and others they have continued their legacy of building roads, bridges, sewage treatment plants, civic and municipal projects, and major award-winning developments such as the 7 tower and 3 tower City in the Park and OMA projects in Burnaby, L'Hermitage, Lumiere and Alexandra towers in Downtown Vancouver, the Edgewater and Water's Edge projects in West Vancouver, and the Vancouver Olympic Village for the 2010 Winter Olympic Games, to mention a few.

Having settled his family in Canada, but later returned to Paris, France in the late 1980s with his wife, Mahin. At the age of 67 he started a successful real estate development company from scratch, undertaking such high-profile projects as the East Side office building in Marne La Vallee, the seat of the French Post Office, Regent Park, St. Georges, Villa du Theatre residences and numerous other successful projects.

He died in Paris in November 2019 at the age of 96.
