= Galgun =

Galgun (Persian: گلگون), also known as Deh Gerdu, may refer to:

- Galguni
- Galkun
