= Fahlian, Iran =

Village in Fars province, Iran

Fahlian Persian: فهلیان
- Village
- Location within Iran
- Coordinates: 30°11′50″N 51°29′53″E
- Country: Iran
- Province: Fars
- County: Mamasani
- District: Central
- Rural District: Fahlian
- Time zone: UTC+3:30 (IRST)

Fahlian (Persian: فهلیان) is a village in, and the capital of, Fahlian Rural District of the Central District of Mamasani County, Fars province, Iran.

== History ==
In 2023, the villages of Fahlian-e Olya and Fahlian-e Sofla were merged to form the village of Fahlian.
