= Azadi Indoor Stadium =

Multipurpose indoor sports venue in Tehran, Iran

Coordinates: 35°43′20″N 51°16′10″E

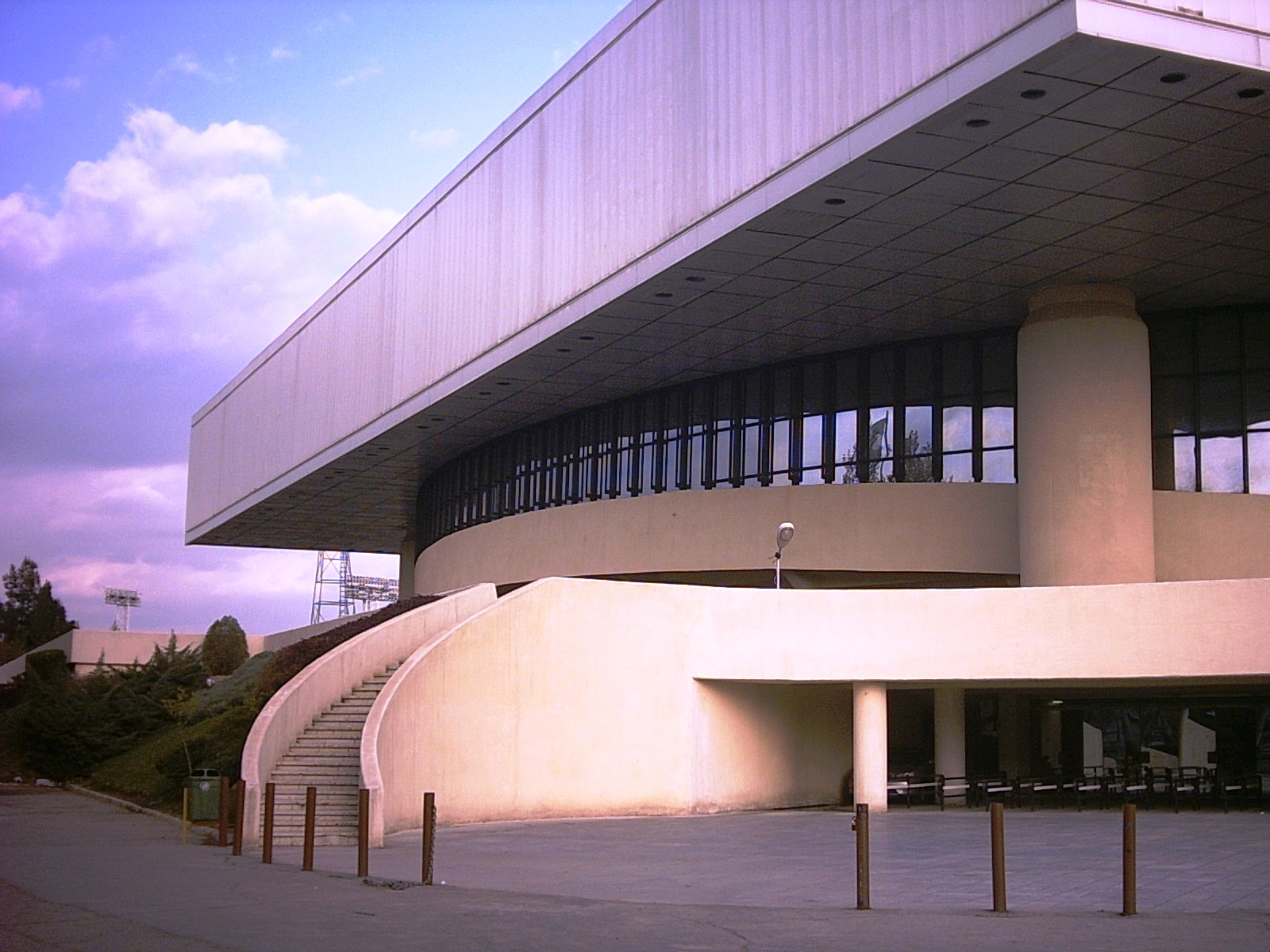
- External view
- Interactive map of Azadi Indoor Stadium
- Full name: Azadi 12,000 Capacity Hall
- Former names: Sports Hall
- Location: Tehran, Iran
- Owner: Ministry of Sport and Youth (Iran)
- Operator: Tehran Municipality
- Capacity: 12,000 (Standing Room); 6,583 (Seating)

Construction
- Groundbreaking: 3 October 1970
- Built: 1970–1971 (1 year)
- Opened: 1 September 1974 (1974 Asian Games)
- Demolished: 5 March 2026 (destroyed by Israeli-American airstrikes during the 2026 Iran War)
- Architect: Abdol-Aziz Farmanfarmaian

Tenants
- Iran men's national volleyball team Iran national futsal team

The Azadi Indoor Stadium, officially named Azadi 12,000 Capacity Hall (Persian: سالن دوازده هزار نفری آزادی), was an indoor sports arena in Tehran, Iran. The stadium had a seating capacity of 6,583 and standing room capacity of 12,000. It was destroyed during the 2026 Iran war.

== History ==
Located within the Azadi Sport Complex, it was mainly used for volleyball, wrestling and futsal matches, but occasionally basketball games were played here. The stadium hosted Iran's national volleyball team, the FIVB Volleyball World League, and the 2014 FILA Wrestling World Cup.

During the 2026 Iran war, a gathering of Iranian internal security forces at the stadium on 5 March was bombed by Israel and the United States, resulting in hundreds of Artesh and IRGC casualties. The Indoor Stadium was completely destroyed by the blast.

== Image gallery ==
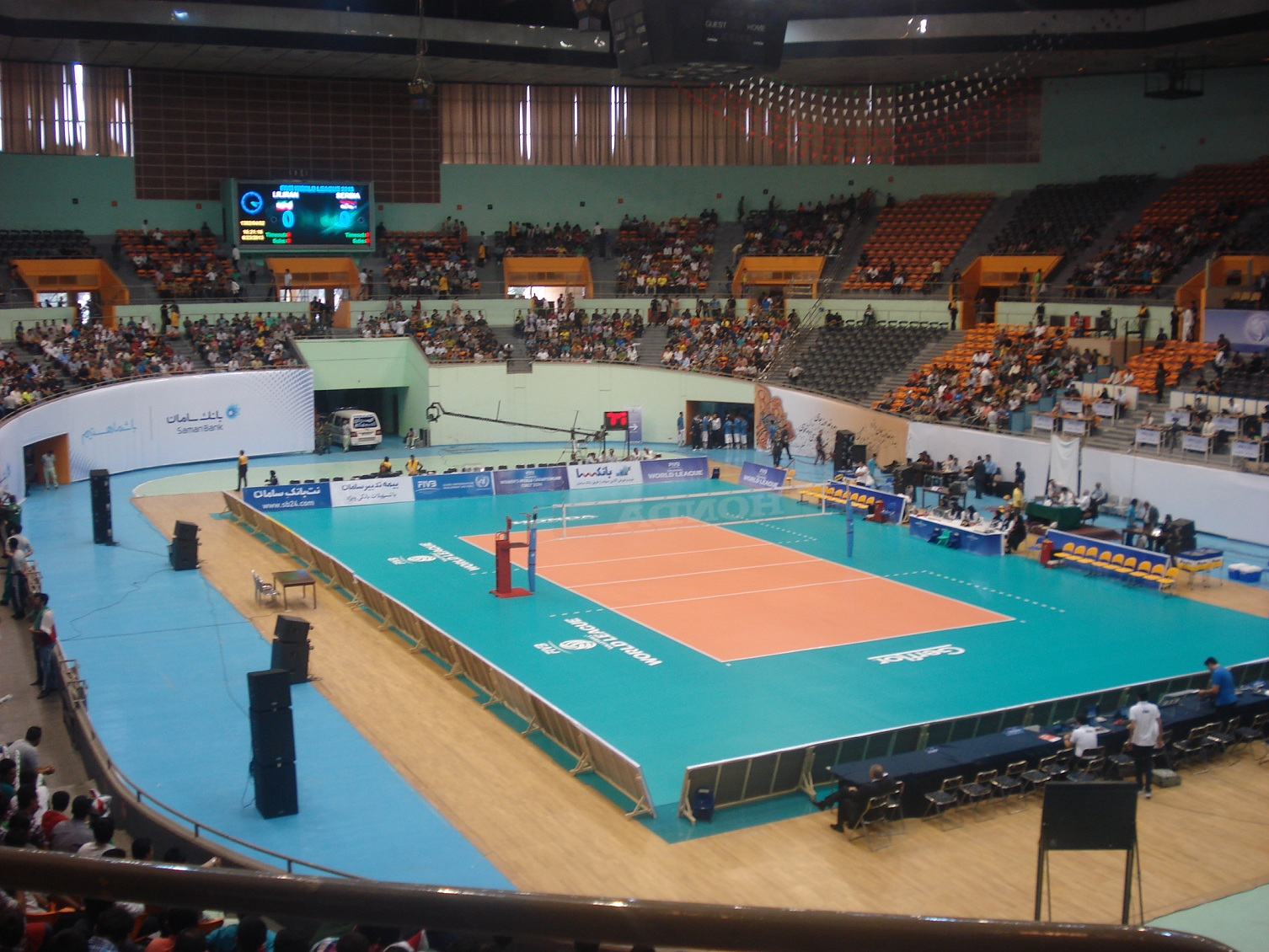
Iran men's national volleyball team plays against Serbia in the 2013 FIVB Volleyball World League

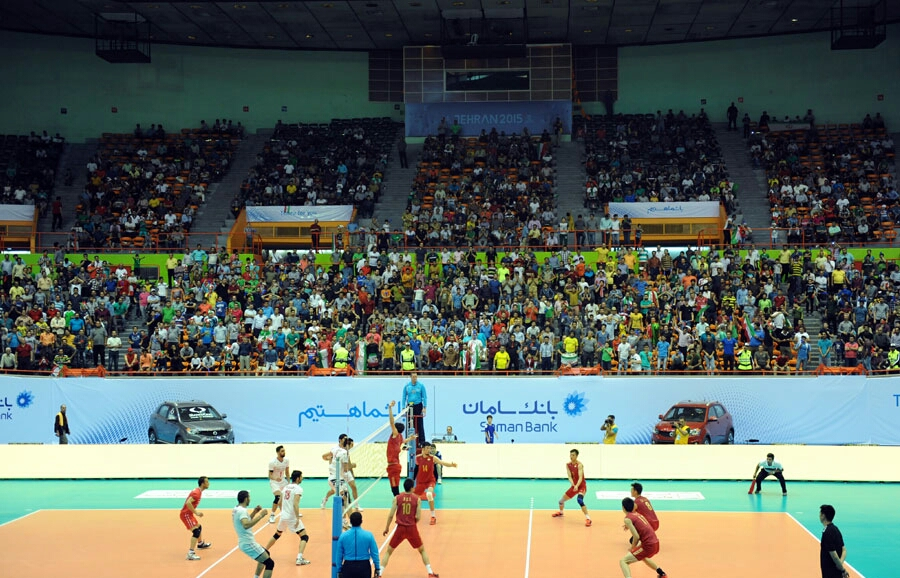
Volleyball match held at Azadi Indoor Stadium on 7 August 2015

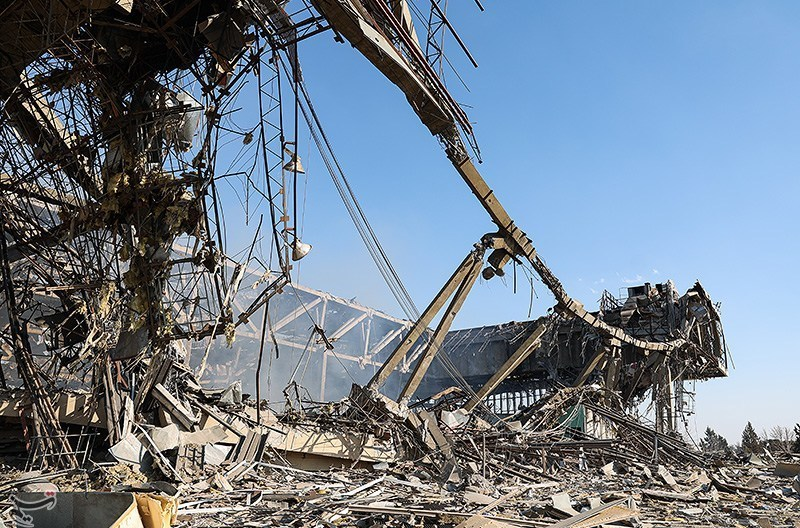
Azadi Indoor Stadium in ruins after Israeli-American airstrike on 5 March 2026

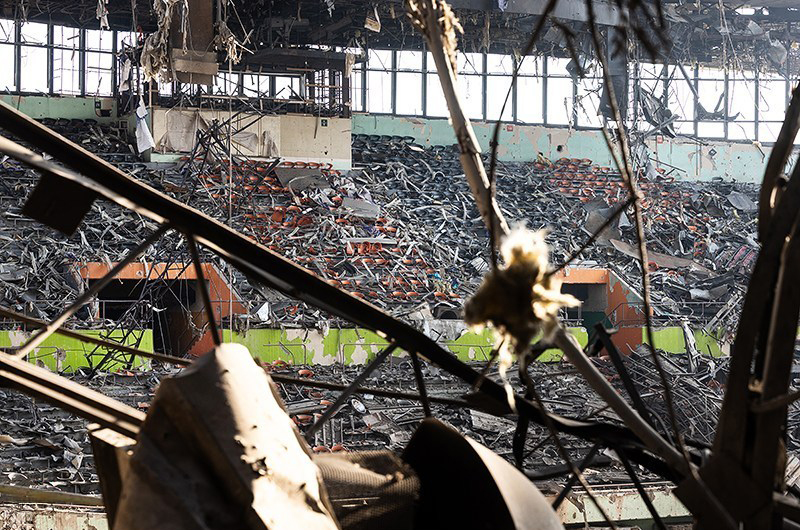
Internal damage to Azadi Indoor Stadium after the bombing
