= Azadi Stadium =

Association football stadium in Iran

Coordinates: 35°43′28″N 51°16′32″E

- ورزشگاهِ آزادی
- Azadi
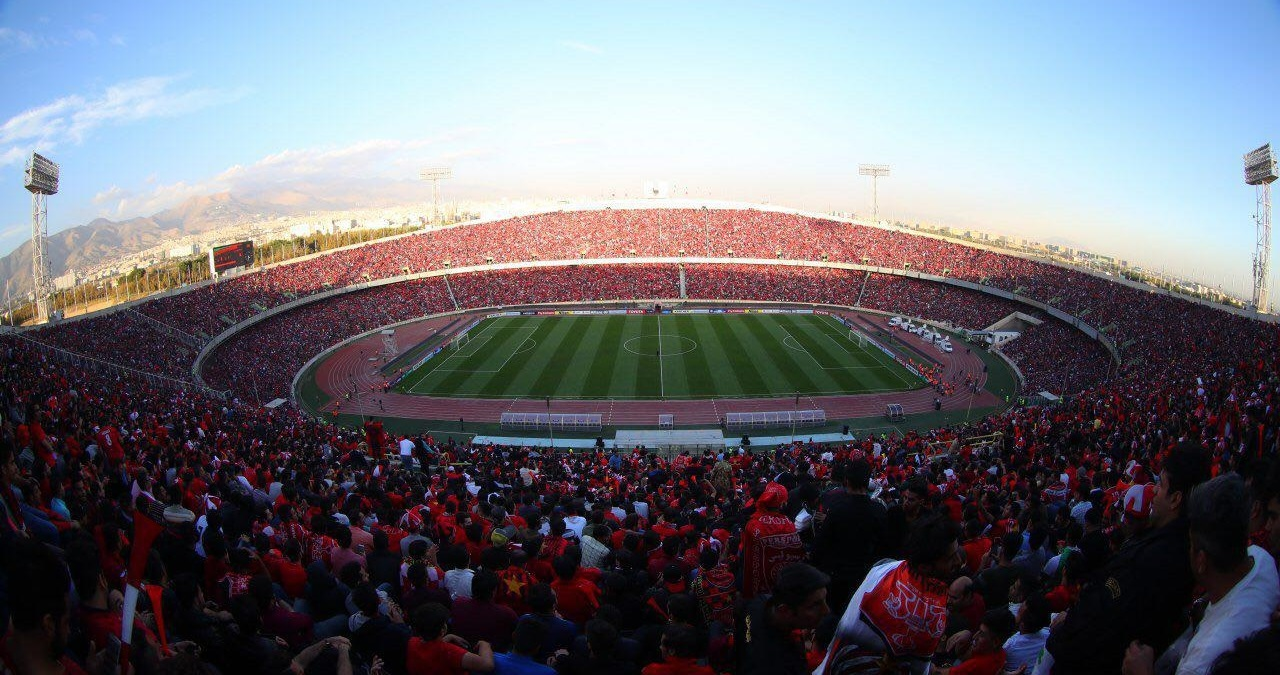
- Stadium during the 2018 AFC Champions League semi-finals
- Interactive map of Azadi Stadium
- Full name: Azadi Stadium
- Location: Tehran, Iran
- Owner: Ministry of Sport and Youth of Iran
- Operator: Azadi Sport Complex; Tehran Municipality
- Capacity: 78,116 (2016–present); 84,412 (2012–2016); 95,225 (2003–2012); 100,000 (1971–2003)
- Surface: Desso GrassMaster
- Scoreboard: 104 m^{2} jumbotron
- Record attendance: 128,000; Iran vs. Australia
- Field size: 110 m × 75 m (361 ft × 246 ft)
- Public transit: Azadi stadium metro station,tehran

Construction
- Groundbreaking: 1 October 1970
- Built: 1970–1971 (1 year)
- Opened: 17 October 1971
- Renovated: 2002–2003; 2023–ongoing
- Cost: 2,578,183,966 tomans (€400,163,944)
- Architect: Abdol-Aziz Mirza Farmanfarmaian
- Project manager: Skidmore, Owings & Merrill
- Structural engineer: James Raymond Whittle

Tenants
- Esteghlal (1973–present); Persepolis (1973–present); Iran national football team (1975–present)

Website
- www.azadisportcomplex.com

The Azadi Stadium (Persian: ورزشگاه آزادی, romanized: Varzeshgâh-e Âzâdi, pronounced [væɹzeʃˈɡɒːhe ɒːzɒːˈdiː]), opened and also well known as the Aryamehr Stadium (Persian: ورزشگاه آریامهر, romanized: Varzeshgâh-e Âryâmehr), is an all-seater football stadium in Tehran, Iran. The stadium was designed by Abdol Aziz Mirza Farman-Farmaian Architects and Associates (AFFA), with other parts of the sports complex based on plans by American architectural and engineering firm Skidmore, Owings & Merrill. It currently has a capacity of 78,116 spectators, as a result of conversion to an all-seater stadium.

Originally named Aryamehr (lit. 'Light of the Aryans') after the title of the Shah, the stadium was inaugurated on 17 of October 1971 by Mohammad Reza Pahlavi, the late Shah of Iran, as part of the greater Aryamehr Sport Complex. Both stadium and complex were renamed after the 1979 Iranian Revolution to Azadi (meaning "freedom" in Persian).

The largest association football stadium in Western Asia, it was built to host the 1974 Asian Games and has hosted the 1976 AFC Asian Cup. The stadium has also hosted five finals of Asian Club Competitions: three finals of AFC Champions League in 1999, 2002 and 2018 and two finals of the Asian Cup Winners' Cup in 1991 and 1993. Azadi Stadium also hosted WAFF Championship Tournament in 2004 and 2008.

Azadi Stadium is currently under the joint ownership of Esteghlal and Persepolis, the capital's two premier football teams, who also shares the stadium as their home ground. It is also the home stadium of the Iran national football team. Because of the loud sound of vuvuzelas frequently used by spectators, similar to the sound of bees, the stadium is sometimes referred to as a "bee swarm".

== Location ==
The stadium is located in western Tehran's District 22, adjacent to Ekbatan Town.

== History ==
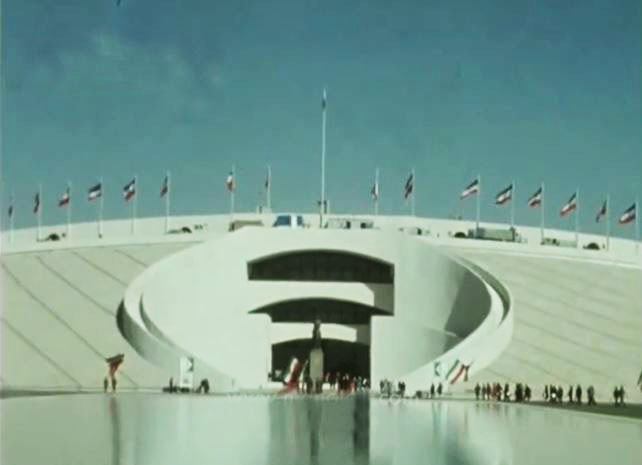
VIP façade of the stadium

The Aryamehr Stadium was constructed by Arme Construction Company and designed by Aziz Farman-Farmaian's architecture firm, AFFA, for the 1974 Asian Games with international criteria. It replaced the Amjadieh Stadium as the new home of Iran's national football team.

The stadium was built as part of a much larger complex which included numerous Olympic-sized venues for various sports, laying the groundwork for ambitious plans for Tehran to make a bid to host the Summer Olympics. In August 1975, the Iranian Shah, Tehran's Mayor and the Iranian Olympic Committee submitted a formal letter to the International Olympic Committee, notifying it of Iran's interest in hosting the 1984 Summer Games. The stadium was the focal point for the bid. But political unrest in the late 1970s saw Tehran drop its bid for the Games, leaving the eventual host, Los Angeles, the only city left bidding.

Renovations first began on the stadium in 2002. Stadium management also planned to later install seats in the upper level of the stadium. Those renovations were completed in 2003 and brought down the capacity of the stadium to well under 100,000. Later upgrades to the stadium brought it down to its current capacity of 78,116. Despite its reduced capacity, Azadi Stadium has been filled over capacity at times, such as the Iran-Japan FIFA World Cup 2006 qualification match in March 2005, which resulted in the deaths of seven people.

In 2004, a large Jumbotron television was added, replacing the original scoreboard. The stadium hosted two West Asian Football Federation Championship in 2004 and 2008. In 2008, AFC forced Sepahan to play the home matches in AFC Champions League in this stadium after their home stadium Naghsh-e Jahan Stadium was closed for renovation. The stadium is also the regular host for Iran U-23 for the Olympic football qualifying.

In recent years, the Iranian Football Federation has repeatedly submitted bids to host the AFC Asian Cup, which Iran last hosted in 1976. But some officials have hinted that rules in Iran banning women from stadiums like Azadi have kept international sports organizations from staging events there. Iranian women have been banned from watching matches at Azadi Stadium since 1982.

During the 2026 Iran war, a gathering of Iranian internal security forces at the nearby Azadi Indoor Stadium on 5 March was bombed by Israel and the United States, resulting in its complete destruction and hundreds of Artesh and IRGC casualties. Some initial reports confused the far smaller Indoor Stadium with Azadi Stadium itself, which is located 500 meters away and not targeted.

== Events ==
- 1974 Asian Games (Tehran 1974) and Opening and closing ceremony of tournament
- 1976 AFC Asian Cup and the Opening and closing ceremony of the tournament
- 1978 Afro-Asian Cup of Nations Final-1 Leg
- 1990–91 Asian Cup Winners' Cup Final-2nd Leg
- 1991 Afro-Asian Cup of Nations Final-1 Leg
- 1992–93 Asian Cup Winners' Cup Final-2nd Leg
- 1993 Afro-Asian Club Championship Final-1Leg
- 1993 ECO Cup
- 1997 West Asian Games were held at the stadium.
- 1998 LG Cup
- 1998–99 Asian Club Championship Semifinals, Third place match and Final
- 2001–02 Asian Club Championship Semifinals, Third place match and Final
- 2000–01 Asian Club Championship all Quarter-finals of West of Asia
- 2003 AFC–OFC Challenge Cup
- 2001 LG Cup
- 2002 LG Cup
- 2003 LG Cup
- 2004 WAFF Championship
- 2006 Film Offside (winner of the Silver Bear at the 2006 Berlin International Film Festival), about girls trying to get into Azadi Stadium to watch a football match, was filmed on location at the stadium.
- 2008 WAFF Championship
- 2010 Solidarity Games in Tehran
- In November 1975, Frank Sinatra held a concert at Aryamehr Stadium.
- 2013 Ferdousi festival in May
- 2015 Women's Islamic Games were held at the stadium.
- 2018 AFC Champions League Final-2nd Leg

Nominated for

- 1984 Summer Olympics, and Opening and Closing ceremony of tournament
- 1990 FIFA World Cup
- 2011 AFC Asian Cup, 2019 AFC Asian Cup, 2027 AFC Asian Cup

== Building and facilities ==
The architect of the stadium was Abdolaziz Farmanfarmaian, with some parts of the complex done in partnership with Skidmore, Owings & Merrill. The structural engineer and project manager for the building of the stadium was James Raymond Whittle from England. At its opening, the stadium had a maximum capacity of 120,000 visitors; this was reduced to 84,000 after renovations in 2003. On big occasions, the crowd swells well beyond that.

== Transportation ==
There is enough parking for 400 cars inside the stadium, and an additional 10,000 parking spots are available outside.

== Record attendance ==
The record attendance at Azadi Stadium is over 128,000, during a 1998 FIFA World Cup qualifier against Australia.

== See also ==
- List of association football stadiums by capacity
- Football in Iran
- Azadi Sport Complex
- Azadi Tower
- Lists of stadiums

Events and tenants
Preceded by National Stadium; Bangkok	Asian Games; Opening and closing ceremonies 1974	Succeeded by National Stadium; Bangkok
Preceded by National Stadium; Bangkok	AFC Asian Cup; Final venue 1976	Succeeded by Sabah Al-Salem Stadium; Kuwait City
Preceded by Hong Kong Stadium; Hong Kong	Asian Club Championship; Final venue 1999	Succeeded by King Fahd Stadium; Riyadh
Preceded by Suwon Sports Complex; Suwon	Asian Club Championship; Final venue 2002	Succeeded by Rajamangala Stadium; Bangkok
Preceded by Abbasiyyin Stadium; Damascus	West Asian Football Federation Championship; Final venue 2004	Succeeded by Amman International Stadium; Amman
Preceded by Amman International Stadium; Amman	West Asian Football Federation Championship; Final venue 2008	Succeeded by King Abdullah Stadium; Amman
