= Fahlian-e Olya, Mamasani =

Neighborhood in Fars province, Iran

Fahlian-e Olya Persian: فهليان عليا
- Neighborhood
- Location within Iran
- Coordinates: 30°11′29″N 51°29′38″E
- Country: Iran
- Province: Fars
- County: Mamasani
- District: Central
- Rural District: Fahlian
- Village: Fahlian

Population (2016)
  - Total: 1,487
- Time zone: UTC+3:30 (IRST)

Fahlian-e Olya (Persian: فهليان عليا) (Note: Also romanized as Fahlīān-e ‘Olyá; also known as Fahleyān Bālā, Faleyūn-e Bozorg, Fahlīān, Fahlīān-e Bālā, and Fehliān) is a neighborhood in the village of Fahlian in Fahlian Rural District of the Central District in Mamasani County, Fars province, Iran.

== Demographics ==
=== Population ===
At the time of the 2006 National Census, Fahlian-e Olya's population was 1,178 in 282 households, when it was a village in Fahlian Rural District. The following census in 2011 counted 1,908 people in 523 households. The 2016 census measured the population of the village as 1,487 people in 480 households. It was the most populous village in its rural district.

After the census, the villages of Fahlian-e Olya and Fahlian-e Sofla were merged to form the village of Fahlian.
