= Azadi Velodrome =

Outdoor velodrome

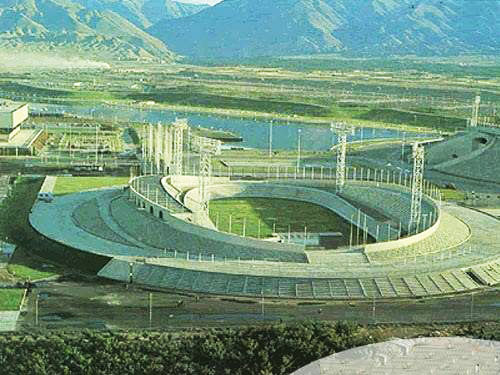
- Azadi Velodrome
- Interactive map of Azadi Velodrome
- Location: Azadi Sport Complex, Tehran, Iran
- Coordinates: 35.722432°N 51.272563°E
- Capacity: 6,000
- Surface: Concrete
- Field size: 333 m (364 yd) track

The Azadi Velodrome is a 333 m (364-yard) outdoor velodrome, with a concrete surface, that is part of the Azadi Sport Complex in Tehran, Iran. It hosted the 2014 Iran national track cycling championships.

== Gallery ==
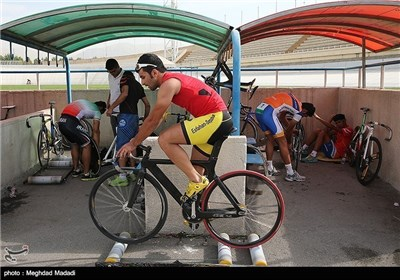
At the middle of the velodrome

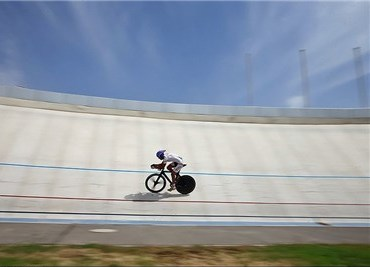
A cyclist riding on the velodrome

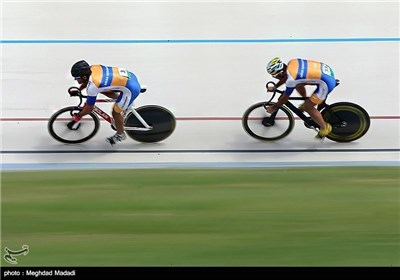
Competition at the velodrome

== See also ==
- List of cycling tracks and velodromes
