= Galguni =

Galguni گلگوني
- Village
- Location within Iran
- Coordinates: 29°57′51″N 51°51′34″E
- Country: Iran
- Province: Fars
- County: Mamasani
- Bakhsh: Doshman Ziari
- Rural District: Mashayekh

Population (2006)
  - Total: 151
- Time zone: UTC+3:30 (IRST)
  - Summer (DST): UTC+4:30 (IRDT)

Galguni (Persian: گلگوني, also Romanized as Galgūnī; also known as Deh Gerdū and Galgūn) is a village in Mashayekh Rural District, Doshman Ziari District, Mamasani County, Fars province, Iran. At the 2006 census, its population was 151, in 36 families.
