= Azadi Sport Complex =

Sports complex in Tehran, Iran

- مجموعه ورزشی آزادی
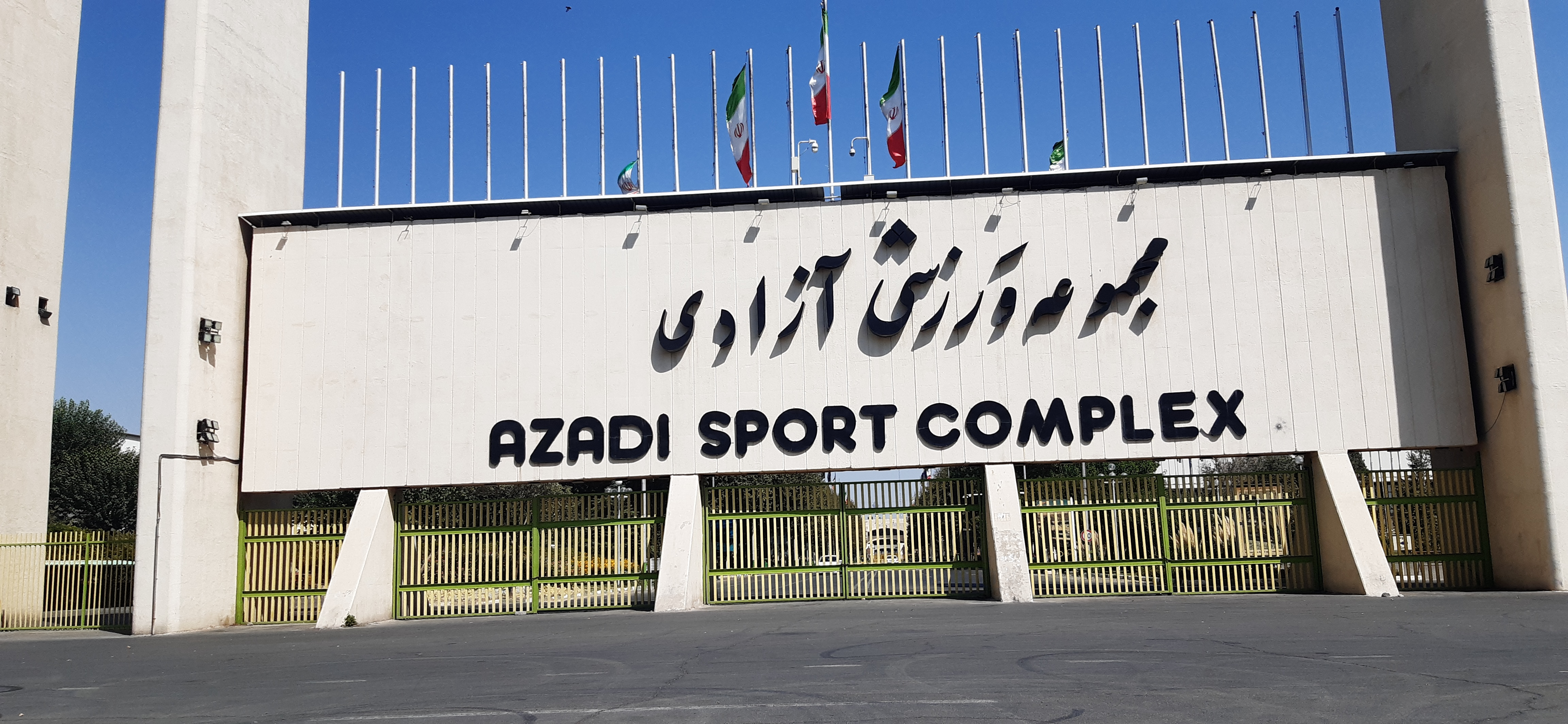
- Interactive map of Azadi Sport Complex
- Full name: Azadi Sport Complex
- Former names: Aryamehr Sports Complex
- Location: Tehran, Iran
- Coordinates: 35°43′24″N 51°16′24″E
- Owner: Ministry of Sport and Youth
- Main venue: Azadi Stadium; Capacity: 78,116

Construction
- Opened: 1 September 1974
- Closed: 5th March 2026
- Architects: Abdol-Aziz Farmanfarmaian & Skidmore, Owings & Merrill
- Builder: Arme Construction Company

Website
- azadisportcomplex.com

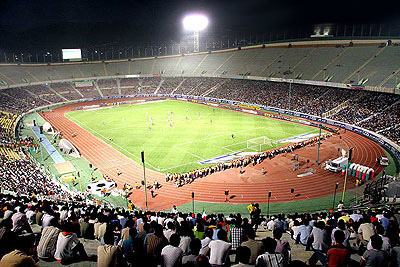
Azadi Stadium

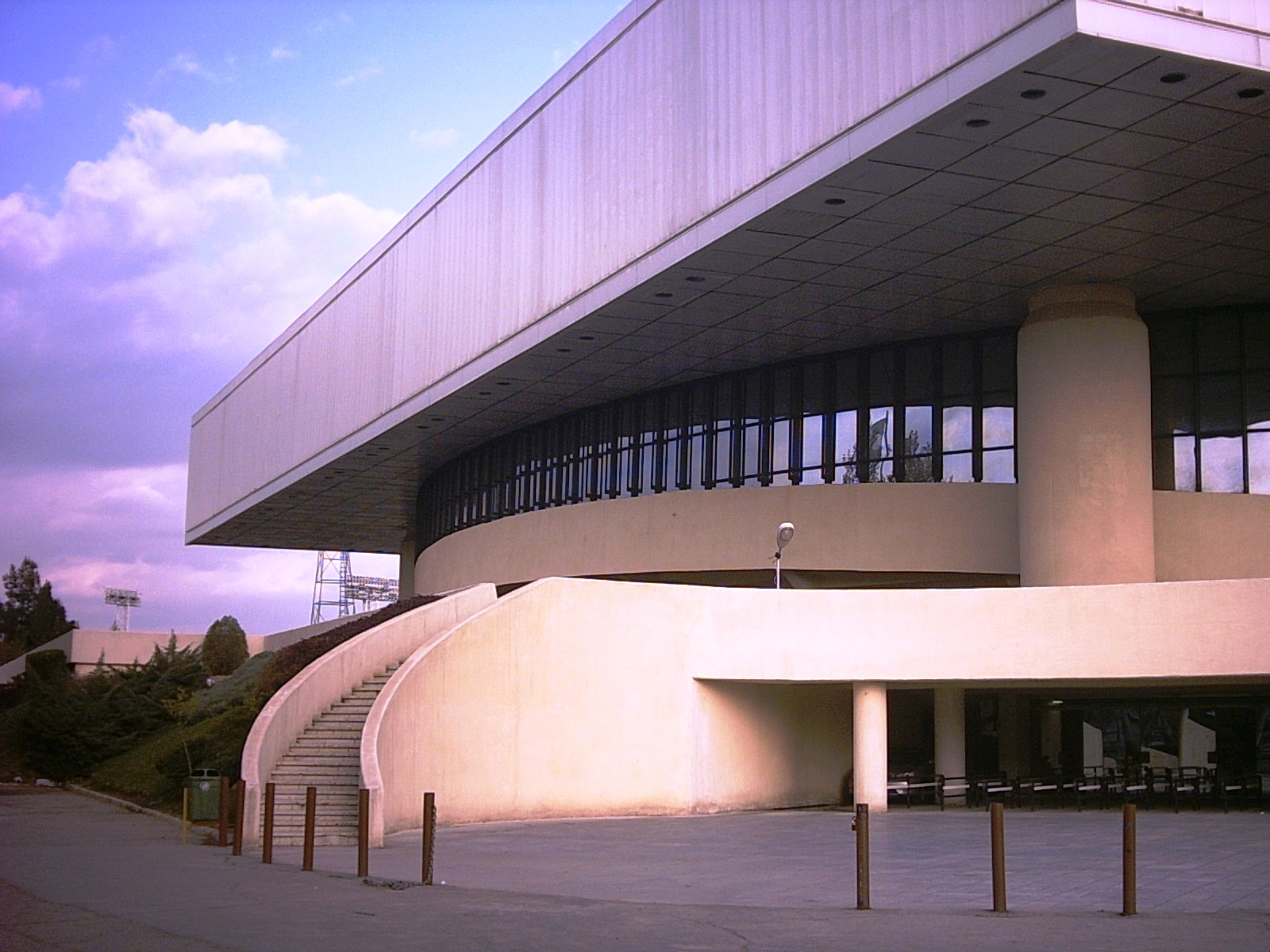
Azadi Indoor Stadium

The Āzādi Sport Complex (Persian: مجموعه ورزشی آزادی), formerly known as Āryāmehr Sports Complex (Persian: مجموعه ورزشی آریامهر), is the national sports complex of Iran, located in Tehran. The Azadi Stadium was located within the walls of this complex. It was designed by Abdol-Aziz Mirza Farmanfarmaian along with the San Francisco office of Skidmore, Owings, & Merrill, and constructed by Iran's Arme Construction Company.

== History ==
The complex was initially built for the 1974 Asian Games, with a future Olympic Games bid in mind. A year later it was presented as part of Tehran's unsuccessful bid to host the 1984 Summer Olympics. In 2013, the website Bleacher Report listed the Azadi Sports Complex as one of the top 20 stadiums in the world.

The Azadi Stadium currently serves as the primary venue for the home matches of the Iran national football team, as well as for two clubs of the capital city, Persepolis and Esteghlal.

During the 2026 Iran war, parts of the sports complex was struck by Israeli-American bombing. The Azadi Indoor Stadium was destroyed by airstrikes targeting Iranian security forces, resulting in hundreds of military casualties.

== Facilities ==
- Azadi Stadium
- Azadi Velodrome
- Azadi Indoor Stadium
- Azadi Swimming Pool Hall
- Azadi Five Halls Complex
  - Azadi Basketball Hall
  - Azadi Weightlifting Hall
  - Azadi Volleyball Hall
  - Azadi Wrestling Hall
  - Azadi Women's Hall
- Azadi Shooting Complex
- Azadi Artificial Lake
- Azadi Driving Court
- Azadi Tennis Courts
- Olympic Hotel, Tehran
- Azadi Equestrian Court
- Azadi Karting Court
- Azadi Baseball Court
- Azadi Football Training Pitches
