= Mamasani (tribe) =

Lur tribe from Iran

Mamasani Lurs
لر ممسنی
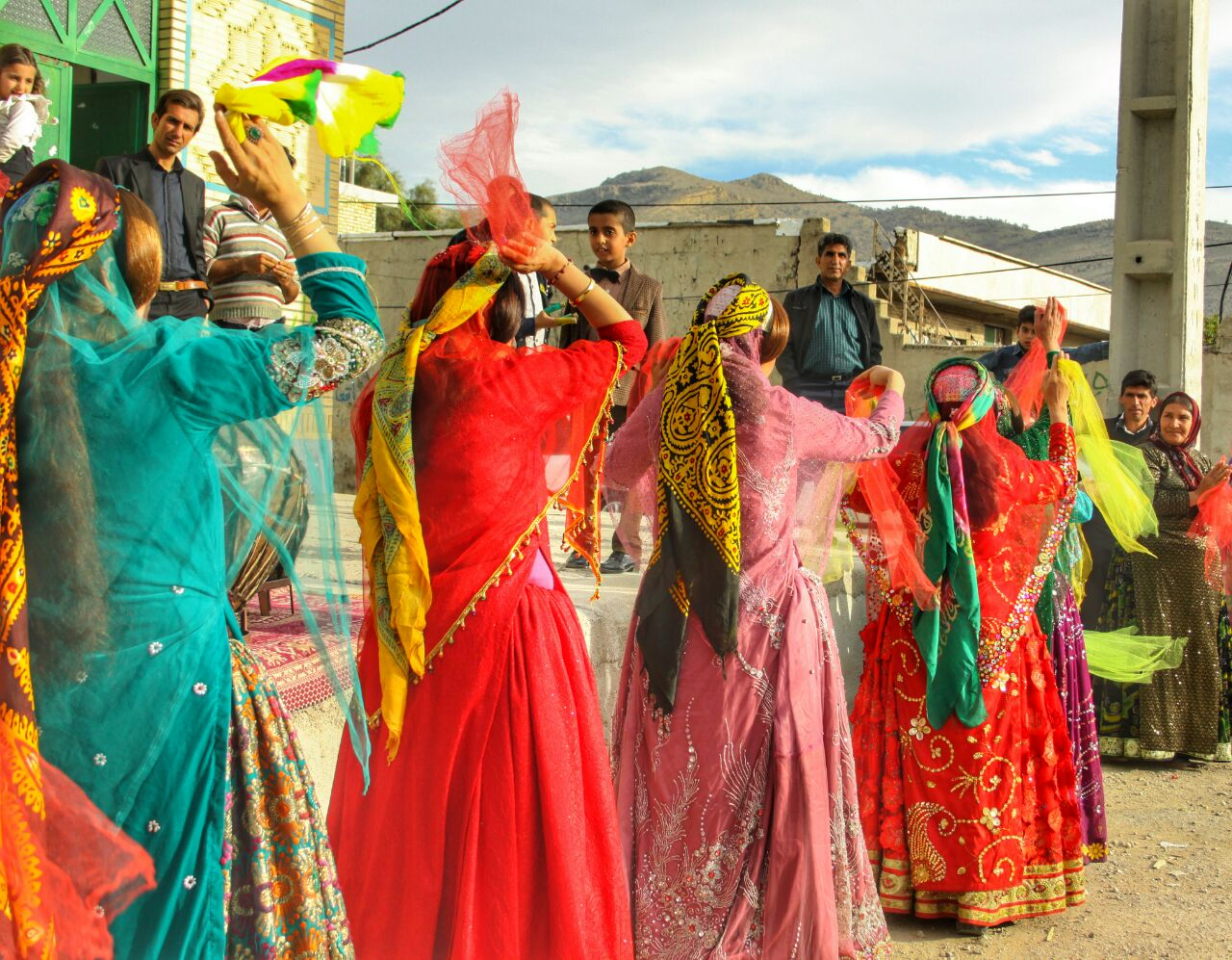
- Mamasani women performing a traditional dance

Regions with significant populations
- Parts of Fars province and Kohgiluyeh and Boyer-Ahmad province

Languages
- Mamasani Luri, Persian

Religion
- Predominantly Shia Islam

Related ethnic groups
- Other Lur tribes

The Mamasani (Persian: ممسنی، مماسن), also Mam-Hasani or Mohammad-Hosayni, are a group of Lur tribes from the historic region of Mamasani in Iran, which was mostly part of Fars province. The Mamasani mainly comprised the tribes of Rostam, Baksh, Javid, and Doshmanziari. They mainly speak the Mamasani dialect of Southern Luri.

== History ==
The Mamasani confederation historically included four main tribes, Rustami, Bakash, Javidi (Javi), and Doshmanziari. They had migrated to Lur-e-Bozorg after 1203-04, and towards the end of Safavid rule, they migrated and occupied the ancient Shulestan. The Shul had been driven from Shulestan earlier by Fadlawi.

The Mamasani territory was historically part of Lur-e-Bozorg. After the Safavid era, Lur-e-Bozorg was divided into the regions of Bakhtiari and Kuhgilu. In the 18th century, the Mamasani confederation occupied the historic Shulistan, which became known as Mamasani, becoming the third Lur territory, located between Kuhgilu and Shiraz. The regions of Mamasani and Kuhgilu were both part of the Fars province. The traditional capital of the Mamasani was Fahliyan. Kuhgilu was located to the west of Mamasani. In the broader sense, Mamasani was the region between Kamfiruz, Ardakan, and Shiraz in the east, Razgird and Kuhgiluya in the west, Kazerun in the south, and Gurspid and Marg on the west. Mamasani, initially a less rigidly defined district between Basht and Ardakan, centering on Fahliyan, Qala-ye Sefid, and Nawbandjan, later became the Mamasani County of Fars province.

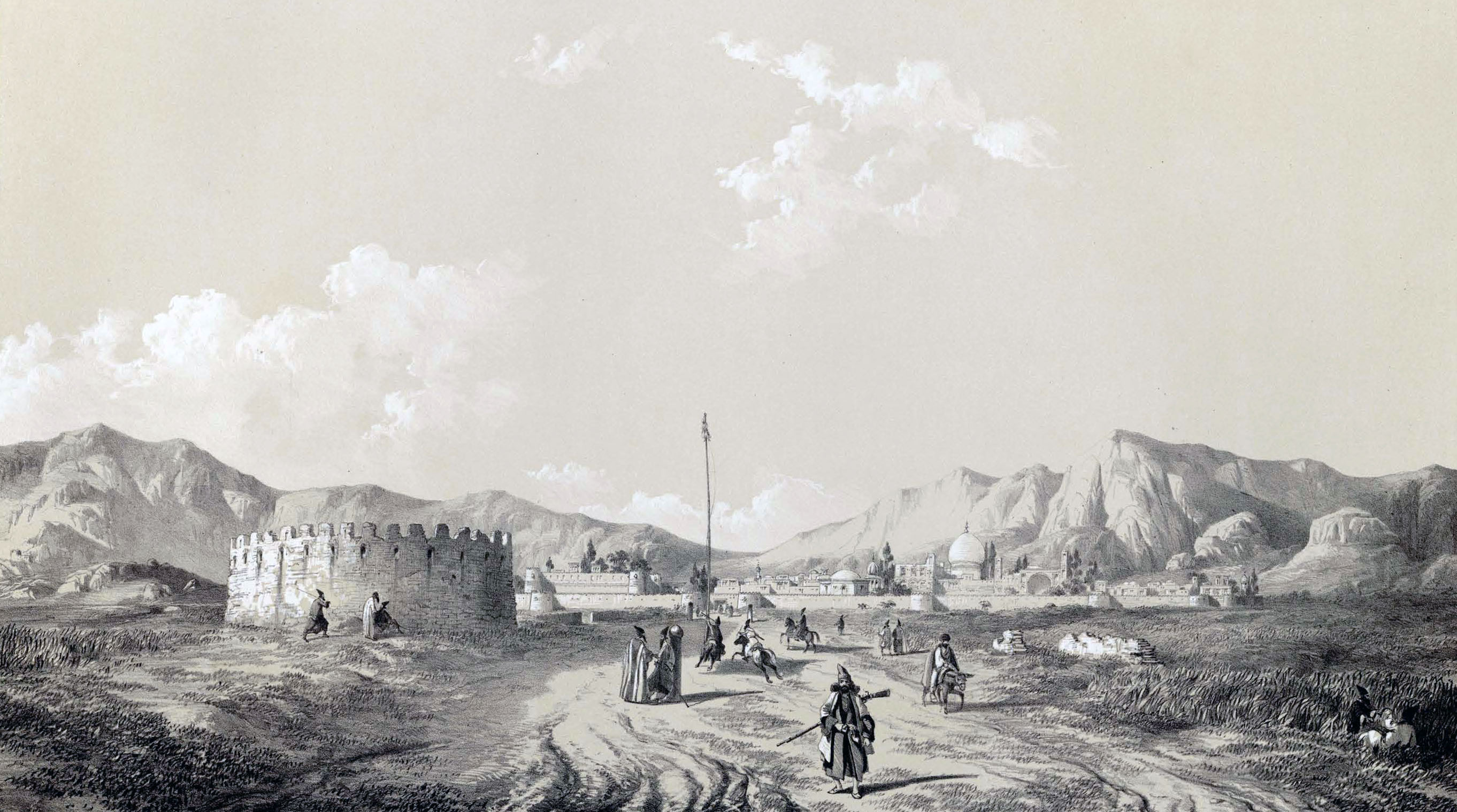
"Mamasani's Tower", painted by Eugène Flandin

The name Mamassani was generally considered a contraction of Mohammad-Hosayni, the putative eponymous ancestor of the tribe. Mamasani tribesmen in the early 20th century variously said he came from Arabia, Dashtestan, or Sistan, while those from the Fahliyan section "claim to have come originally from Jebel A’mal in the Hejaz." One of the earliest mentions of the "Memaseni" or "Memasty" dated back to the reign of the Emad al-Din Hazarasp, the atabek of Lorestan, in 1204-29 or 1252, to whom they pledged fealty as an ally. When Hazarasp took possession of Shulestan, he built villages and colonies. However, most sources indicated that the Mamasani migrated at a later date.

Quintus Curtius Rufus mentioned a group called the "Memaceni" while describing Alexander’s campaign in Sogdiana, and some scholars saw them as the ancestors of the later Mamasani, while others rejected any association between the two groups. Frederic Shoberl considered "the tribes of the southern provinces, such as the Bakhtiarees, the Faeelees, and the Mamassounees…the descendants of those savage hordes which dwelt in the same parts in the time of Alexander", although all the other writers indicated the Mamasani originated outside of Fars. One tradition suggested that the Mamasani were "transplanted" to Shulestan by Nader Shah, although Hasan Fasa'i claimed that "during the last years of the Safavis the Lur tribes of Mamassani took possession of Shulistan and renamed the district after themselves." Hasan Beg Rumlu suggested an even earlier presence in Fars, mentioning "the leaders of Shulestan, and the Mamaseni", who consisted of 1000 men combined in 1548 during the reign of Shah Tahmasp I. Some claimed in a 1945 interview that the Mamasani had occupied Shulestan "in the wake of the retreating Afghans before whom the original inhabitants" had fled. Nevertheless, Shulestan became known as Boluq-e Mamasani, although by 1891, the name Shulestan was still used for the Mamasani region. The Mamasani provided tofangchis to Shah Abbas I during the war with the Ottomans. In 1671, Malek Mohammad served as "minbashi of the Mamasani" under Mortezaqoli Khan, the governor of Bandar Abbas, during the Safavid campaign in Kech-Makran. The Tohfa-ye Shahi, compiled in 1715/16, listed the Mamasani as one of the divisions of the Lurs, calling them "vicious people, thieves and highwaymen." In 1786-87, Mohammad Khan Zand led a punitive mission against the Mamasani, and the following year another Mohammad Khan, the paternal uncle of Lotf-Ali Khan, sought refuge with the Mamasani as his mother was a Mamasani. A decade later, the "Mumsany, one of the Farsi tribes", attacked Mohammad Khan Zand.

Mamasani tribesmen in Rostam playing the traditional saz and naghareh

In 1918, the Bakash tribe of the Mamasani included the clans of Karai, Alivand, Babar Salar, Babar Dangehi, Hezar-o-Si, Shir Espari, Ali Lor Amiri, Sheikh Shahru, Gojar, Pir-al-Dini, Ali Hemmati, Khalafi, Zayn-al-Dini, Atuni, Barmaki, and Shirmard, altogether numbering 1200 families. The Javidi tribe included the clans of Khalifa Harun, Javi Do Dungeh, Musa Arabi, Ahmad Harun, Salari, Laleh, Khas, Zir Zardi, Kira, Mehrengun, Madui, Amui, Goja, Mal Qaid, Jogun, Pir Hasan Abdullah, and Surnabadi, altogether numbering 700 families. The Rostam tribe included the clans of Shah Hasani, Masiri, Bageri, Zameni, Behyari, Mangudarz, Shahjahan Ahmadi and Ghului, Dehnani, Uruji, Giveh Kesh, Dehtuti, Pehrin, Tugak, Gol Bakun, Tirazgun, Surneh, Bardengan, and Dashti, altogether numbering 800 families. The Doshmanziari, who were still considered Mamasani in 1910, were no longer considered part of the confederation by 1945, when the Mamasani comprised four divisions, the Rostam, Bakash, Javidi, and Fahliyan. The Doshmanziari in 1958 comprised the tribes of Serenjelak, Bakshi, Mahmudi, Tirtaji, Kolahsiah, Tawakkoli, Hasani, Harayjani, Mashayekh, Ardeshiri, Rudbali, and Baba Shamsoddini. The Doshmanziari historically associated with the Mamasani were distinct from the Doshmanziari associated with the Chaharbonicha tribes of the Kohgiluyeh confederation.

The majority of the Mamasani became sedentary agriculturalists. By the late 1990s, the total population of Mamasani County was estimated at over 200,000, although only 20,000 were nomadic. The Mamasani traditionally spoke the Mamasani dialect of Southern Luri, although some Mamasani spoke Turkic.

The armed strength of the Mamasani was around 2,000 riflemen and 230 cavalry in 1921, and they were engaged in a conflict with the Pahlavi government throughout the 1920s. Even after the region was largely suppressed by the government, the Mamasani rebelled in 1928, and joined a broader tribal rebellion in 1929. After the region was pacified in 1934, the Boyer-Ahmadi and Mamasani lands were "occupied by military posts and these tribes were increasingly divided up into small sections." In 1962-63, the Mamasani joined many tribes of southern Iran in another rebellion against the government, which was quickly suppressed. The Mamasani region was active during the 2025 Iranian protests and targeted in the ensuing massacres.

There was also a Brahui-speaking tribe known as "Mohammad Hasani" or "Mamasani Baluch" in Zabol, and a tribe known as "Duzdap Mamasani" in Sistan, as well as a Kurdish tribe called Mamasani belonging to the Surchi confederation, although, their relation to the Mamasani Lurs were unclear. However, Jalal Yousefi proposed that the various Lur, Kurdish, Sistani, Balochi, and Brahui groups named Mamasani were connected and of shared Sogdian origin.
