= Khumeh Zar =

City in Fars province, Iran

Khumeh Zar Persian: خومه زار
- City
- Location within Iran
- Coordinates: 30°00′36″N 51°34′35″E
- Country: Iran
- Province: Fars
- County: Mamasani
- District: Central

Population (2016)
  - Total: 6,220
- Time zone: UTC+3:30 (IRST)

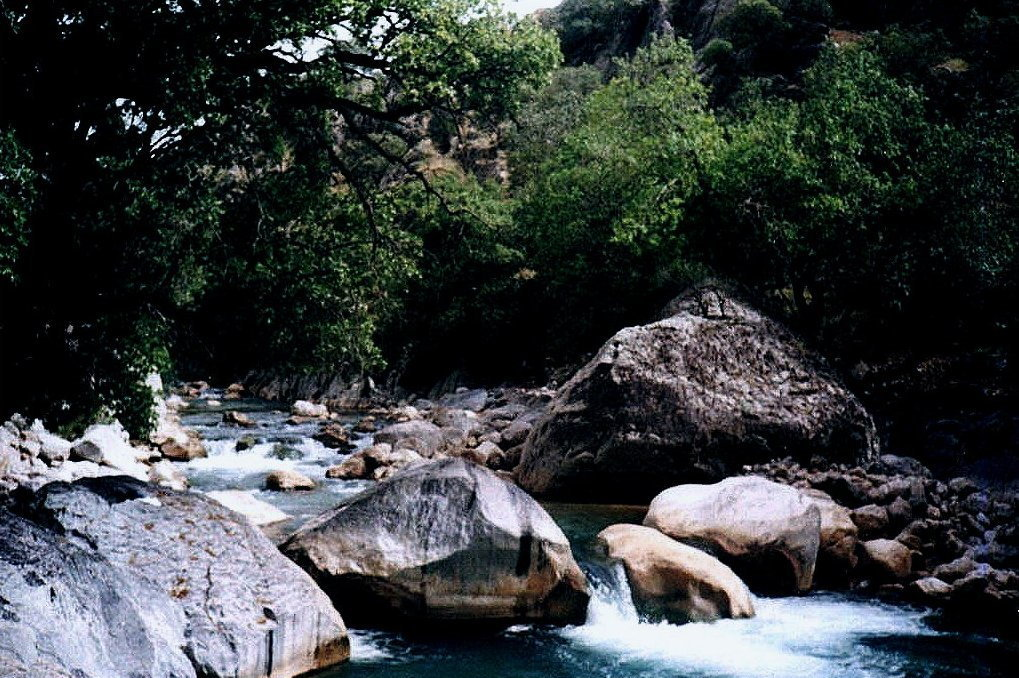
Harairaz village is one of the tourist areas of Khumeh Zar

Khumeh Zar (Persian: خومه زار) (Note: Also romanized as Khūmeh Zār; formerly the village of Khumeh Zar-e Sofla) is a city in the Central District of Mamasani County, Fars province, Iran.

== Demographics ==
=== Population ===
At the time of the 2006 National Census, the population (as the village of Khumeh Zar-e Sofla) was 5,550 in 1,262 households. The following census in 2011 counted 6,095 people in 1,551 households, by which time the village had been elevated to city status as Khumeh Zar. The 2016 census measured the population of the city as 6,220 people in 1,765 households.
