= Alishahi, Kerman =

Alishahi عليشاهي
- Village
- Location within Iran
- Coordinates: 29°17′06″N 57°30′49″E
- Country: Iran
- Province: Kerman
- County: Jiroft
- Bakhsh: Sarduiyeh
- Rural District: Gevar

Population (2006)
  - Total: 279
- Time zone: UTC+3:30 (IRST)
  - Summer (DST): UTC+4:30 (IRDT)

Alishahi (Persian: عليشاهي, also Romanized as ‘Alīshāhī; also known as Khāneh Sorkh) is a village in Gevar Rural District, Sarduiyeh District, Jiroft County, Kerman Province, Iran. At the 2006 census, its population was 279, in 57 families.
