= Jowzar, Kohgiluyeh and Boyer-Ahmad =

Jowzar جوزار
- Village
- Location within Iran
- Coordinates: 30°45′30″N 51°19′06″E
- Country: Iran
- Province: Kohgiluyeh and Boyer-Ahmad
- County: Dana
- Bakhsh: Kabgian
- Rural District: Kabgian

Population (2006)
  - Total: 325
- Time zone: UTC+3:30 (IRST)
  - Summer (DST): UTC+4:30 (IRDT)

Jowzar (Persian: جوزار, also Romanized as Jowzār and Jūzār; also known as Nīzār) is a village in Kabgian Rural District, Kabgian District, Dana County, Kohgiluyeh and Boyer-Ahmad Province, Iran. At the 2006 census, its population was 325, in 64 families.
