= Nurabad, Fars =

City in Fars province, Iran

Nurabad Persian: نورآباد
- City
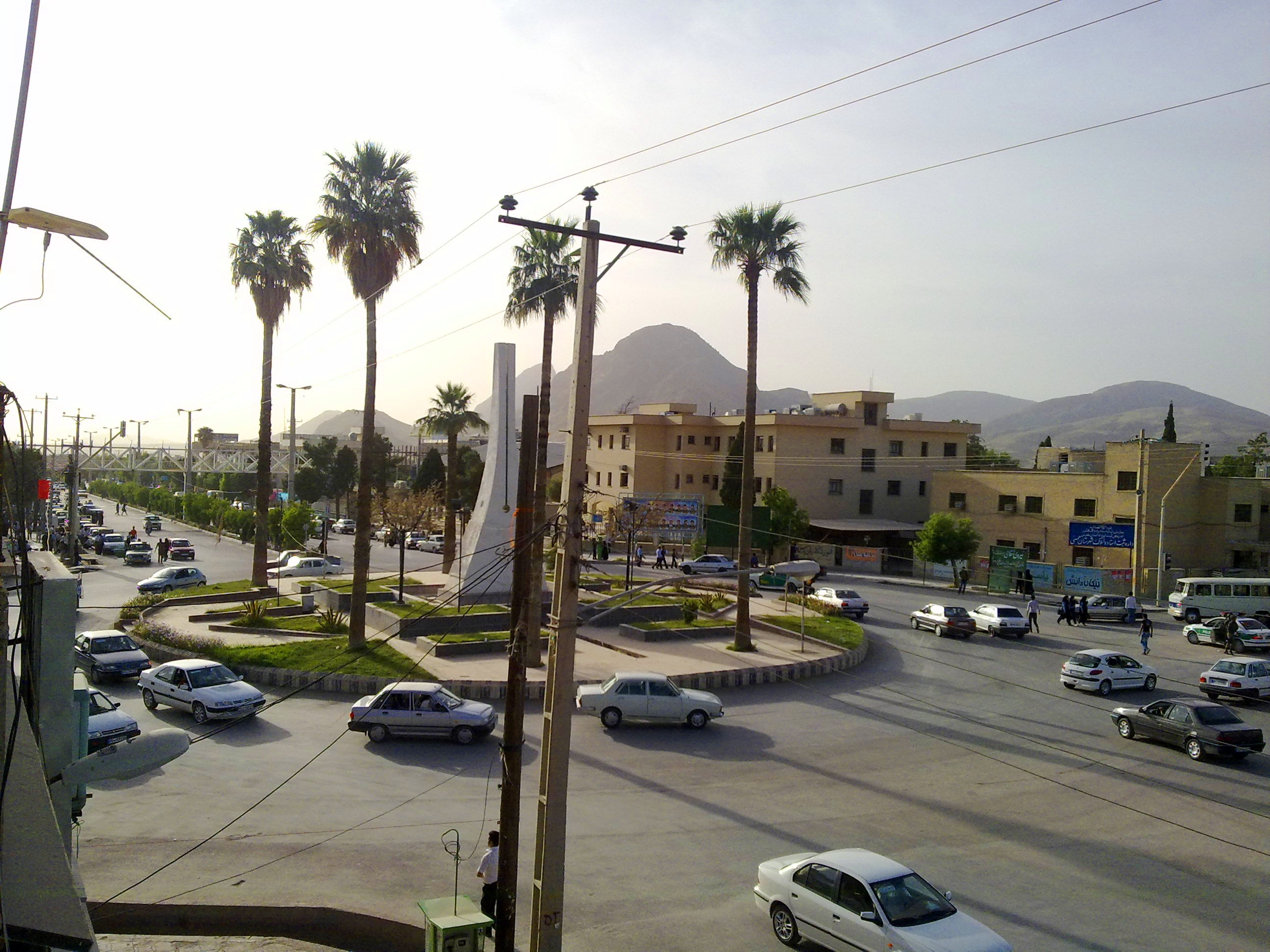
- Nurabad central square

- Location within Iran
- Coordinates: 30°06′35″N 51°32′16″E
- Country: Iran
- Province: Fars
- County: Mamasani
- District: Central
- Elevation: 920 m (3,020 ft)

Population (2016)
  - Total: 57,058
- Time zone: UTC+3:30 (IRST)
- Area code: (+98) 071
- Website: diarmamasani.ir

Nurabad (Persian: نورآباد) (Note: Also romanized as Nūrābād) is a city in the Central District of Mamasani County, Fars province, Iran, serving as capital of both the county and the district.

== Demographics ==
=== Population ===
At the time of the 2006 National Census, the city's population was 51,668 in 11,006 households. The following census in 2011 counted 55,736 people in 14,668 households. The 2016 census measured the population of the city as 57,058 people in 16,430 households.

== Geography ==
=== Location ===
Nurabad is 58.7 kilometres (36.5 mi) from Kazerun, 80.5 kilometres (50.0 mi) from Yasuj, Kohgiluyeh and Boyer-Ahmad province, 87.8 kilometres (54.6 mi) from Dogonbadan, Kohgiluyeh and Boyer-Ahmad, and 100.2 kilometres (62.3 mi) from Borazjan, Bushehr province.

=== Climate ===
Climate data for Nurabad
Month	Jan	Feb	Mar	Apr	May	Jun	Jul	Aug	Sep	Oct	Nov	Dec	Year
Mean daily maximum °C (°F)	13.8 (56.8)	15.2 (59.4)	17.4 (63.3)	21.0 (69.8)	27.4 (81.3)	34.3 (93.7)	39.3 (102.7)	40.6 (105.1)	38.9 (102.0)	33.6 (92.5)	27.4 (81.3)	21.4 (70.5)	27.5 (81.5)
Mean daily minimum °C (°F)	2.7 (36.9)	3.8 (38.8)	4.7 (40.5)	8.3 (46.9)	13.1 (55.6)	18.9 (66.0)	24.8 (76.6)	25.5 (77.9)	22.6 (72.7)	17.9 (64.2)	13.6 (56.5)	9.9 (49.8)	13.8 (56.9)
Average precipitation mm (inches)	54 (2.1)	54 (2.1)	46 (1.8)	9 (0.4)	2 (0.1)	0 (0)	0 (0)	1 (0.0)	1 (0.0)	7 (0.3)	29 (1.1)	58 (2.3)	261 (10.2)
Source: Climate-Data.org

== Archeological Sites ==
7 kilometers west of Nurabad lies Dom-e Mil, a stone tower dating to the Sasanian Period.
