= Deh-e Gerduiyeh =

Deh-e Gerduiyeh ده گردوييه
- Village
- Location within Iran
- Coordinates: 29°14′03″N 57°14′51″E
- Country: Iran
- Province: Kerman
- County: Jiroft
- Bakhsh: Sarduiyeh
- Rural District: Sarduiyeh

Population (2006)
  - Total: 140
- Time zone: UTC+3:30 (IRST)
  - Summer (DST): UTC+4:30 (IRDT)

Deh-e Gerduiyeh (Persian: ده گردوييه, also Romanized as Deh-e Gerdū’īyeh; also known as Deh-e Gazhdū and Deh Gerdū) is a village in Sarduiyeh Rural District, Sarduiyeh District, Jiroft County, Kerman Province, Iran. At the 2006 census, its population was 140, in 27 families.
