= Mamasani dialect =

Dialect of Southern Luri

Mamasani Luri
- لوری ممسنی
- Native to: Iran
- Region: Middle East
- Ethnicity: Mamasani Lurs
- Language family: Indo-European: Indo-Iranian; Iranian; Western Iranian; Southwestern; Luri; Southern Luri; Mamasani Luri
- Writing system: Persian alphabet

Language codes
- ISO 639-3: luz
- Glottolog: mama1269
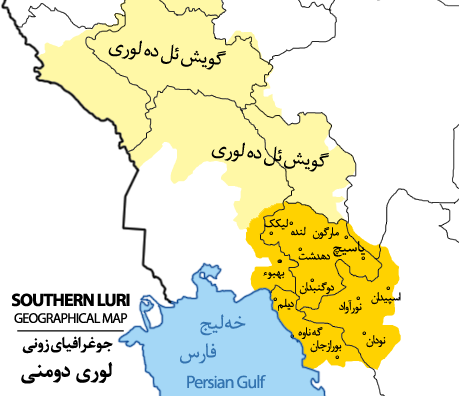
- Areas in southern Iran that speak the southern Lori language (darker yellow)

Mamasani Luri (Luri: لوری ممسنی) is one of the sub-dialects of the Southern Luri dialect of the Luri language. It is spoken by Mamasani Lurs.

== See also ==
- Bakhtiari dialect
