= Jowzar District =

District in Fars province, Iran

Jowzar District Persian: بخش جوزار
- District
- Location within Iran
- Coordinates: 30°17′41″N 51°44′57″E
- Country: Iran
- Province: Fars
- County: Mamasani
- Capital: Mehrenjan
- Time zone: UTC+3:30 (IRST)

Jowzar District (Persian: بخش جوزار) is in Mamasani County, Fars province, Iran. Its capital is the village of Mehrenjan, whose population at the time of the 2016 National Census was 1,508 in 525 households.

== History ==
In 2019, Jowzar Rural District was separated from the Central District in the formation of Jowzar District.

== Demographics ==
=== Administrative divisions ===
Jowzar District
Administrative Divisions
Jowzar RD
Pereshkaft RD
RD = Rural District
