= Abdol-Aziz Mirza Farmanfarmaian =

Iranian architect (1920–2013)

- Born: Abdol-Aziz Mirza Farmanfarmaian; 21 June 1920; Bam, Qajar Iran
- Died: 21 June 2013 (aged 93); Palma de Mallorca, Spain
- Occupation: Architect
- Parent: Abdol-Hossein Farman Farma
- Practice: Architects
- Projects: Azadi Sport Complex

Abdolaziz Farmanfarmaian (Persian: عبدالعزیز فرمانفرمائیان; 1920 – 21 June 2013) was an Iranian architect, offspring of Iranian nobleman Abdol-Hossein Farman Farma and a member of the Qajar dynasty of Iran. In 1976, the company known as AFFA (Abdol Aziz Farman-Farmaian and Associates) was created for the design of the Aryamehr Stadium which after the Iranian Revolution in 1979 was renamed to Azadi Stadium.

== Biography ==
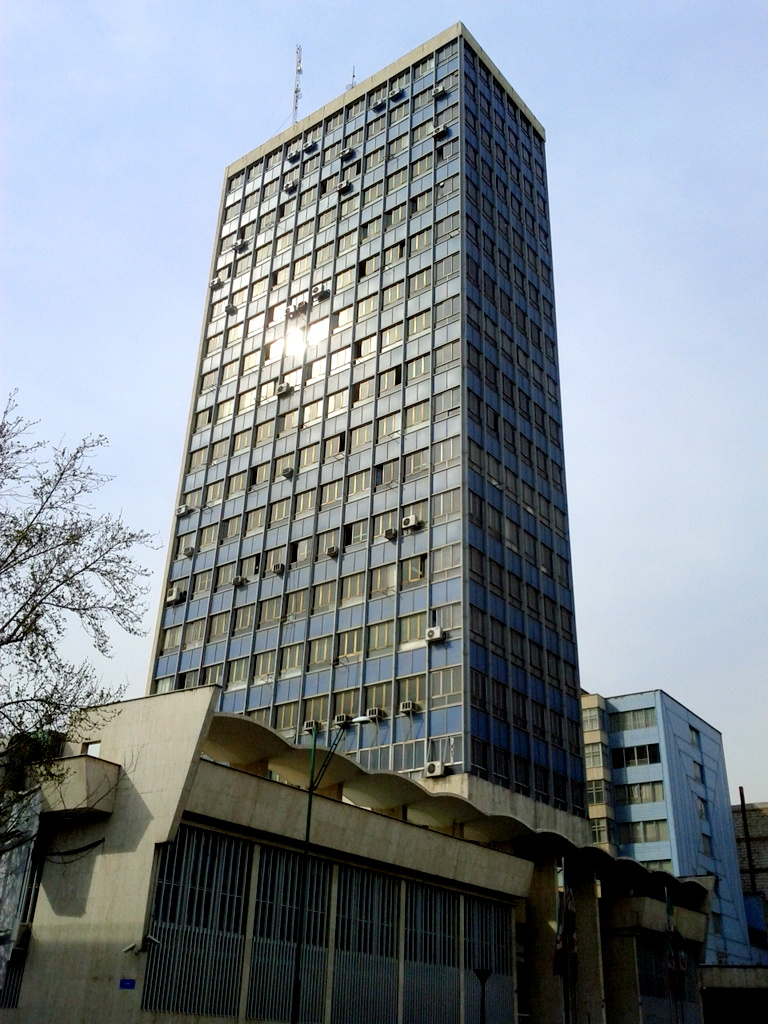
Tehran Stock Exchange Building

Abdol Aziz Farman-Farmaian was born in Shiraz in 1920 as the tenth son of Prince Abdol-Hossein Farman Farma, at the time Governor General of the province of Shiraz. In 1928, at the age of 8, he was sent to school in France, where he remained for his primary and secondary education at Lycée Michelet in Paris until 1938. A brief trip to Iran during the short summer of 1935 was his first contact as an adolescent with his family.

He received his Baccalaureate degree in 1938. Prince Abdol Hossein Mirza organised Mr. Desiré Roustan, a leading French philosopher and writer, as the guardian for four of his sons, including Abdol Aziz Farman-Farmaian. Architectural studies were initiated in the École Spéciale d'Architecture, where he started to prepare for the Beaux Arts School. The onset of World War II broke the continuity of his studies, and he had to leave for Iran in 1940, where he stayed until 1945. During this period of worldwide uncertainty, he worked at different jobs such as: Tehran Municipality, Karnsaks, and the Ministry of Culture (Vezarat-e Pishehonar).

In 1942, he married Leila Gharagozlou and formed a family, having a son.

After the end of World War II, Abdol Aziz Farman-Farmaian came back to Paris with his family to continue his studies and was admitted to the Atelier of Mr. Nicot at the world-famous Ecole des Beaux Arts where he received his degree in 1950. The final project presented as his thesis was the design for a modern caravanserai to be situated in southern Iran. This project received the prize for the best thesis (diploma) of the year.

In 1950, Abdol Aziz Farman-Farmaian moved back to Tehran for good until 1979, where he proceeded to create one of Iran's most important modern-day architectural legacies.

The initial years—The Razmara period, followed by the Mossadegh years—were marked by an unstable political and economic situation. Abdol Aziz Farman-Farmaian started to work as a civil servant at the University of Tehran in the Department of Construction, where he became departmental director after a few years. During the same period, he was given a professorial chair at the Tehran University school of Architecture (Daneshkadeh Honarha-ye Ziba), where he taught architecture until 1957–58.

In 1954, Abdol Aziz Farman-Farmaian was admitted to the Plan Organization as a recognized consultant. At this time when Abdol Aziz Farman-Farmaian designed numerous private residences for his extended relatives, friends, and clients. The legal entity that was set up was known as Moassesseh-ye Abdol Aziz Farman-Farmaian. In 1976, the company known as AFFA, Abdol Aziz Farman-Farmaian and Associates, was created for the design of the Stadium and following the directive of the Plan Organization to be associated with younger architects. The new associates belonged to Reza Majd and Farokh Hirbod, both graduates from first-class American universities. AFFA's associates increased over the years.

Farman-Farmaian permanently moved to Paris in 1980 and afterwards to Spain, where he died aged 93. He was also in close contact with his partner Reza Majd, who still practiced architecture until recently in Palma, Mallorca, Spain.

== Project list ==
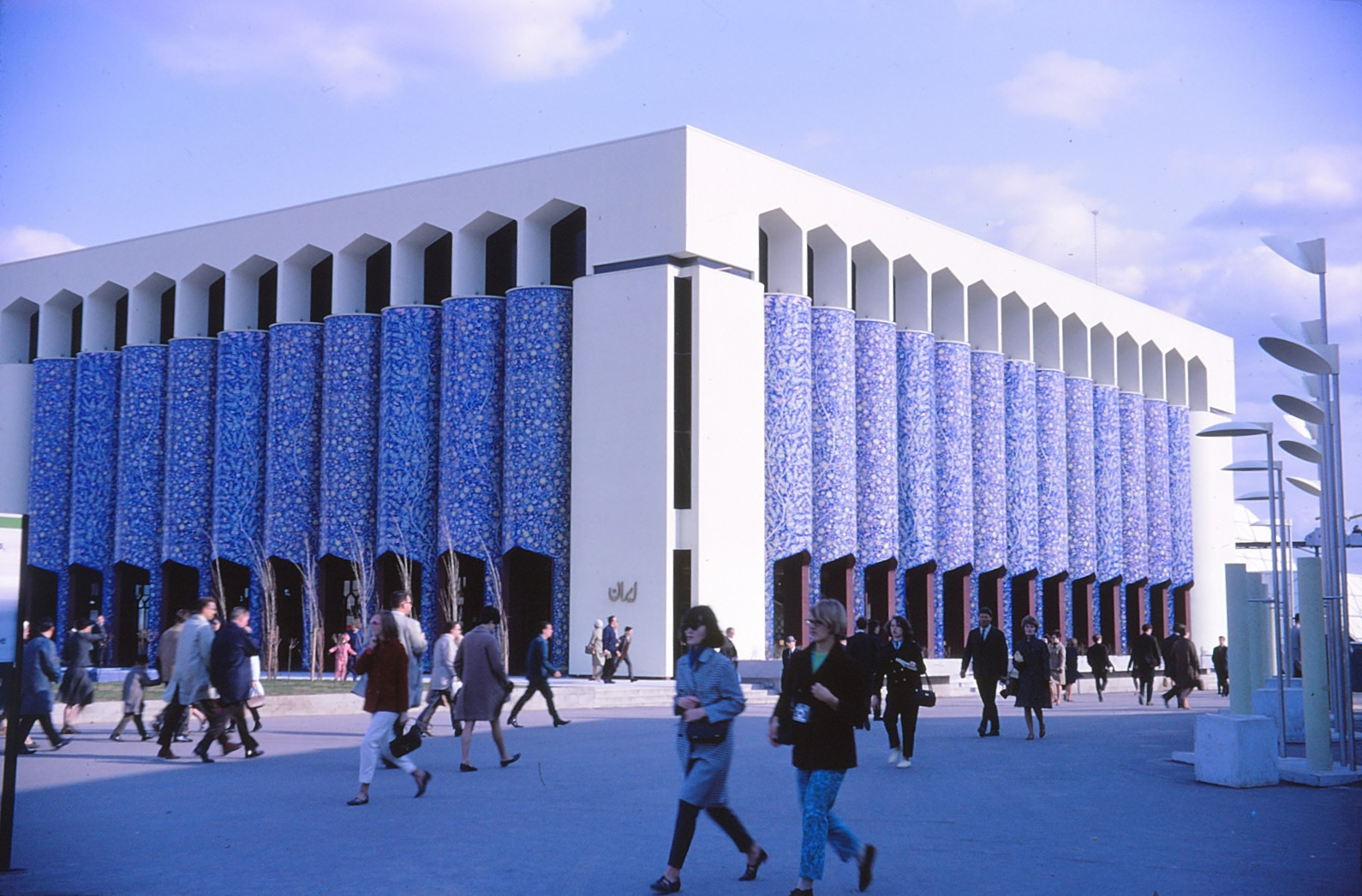
Expo 67, Iran Pavilion, on Saint-Helen Island. Montréal, Québec, Canada

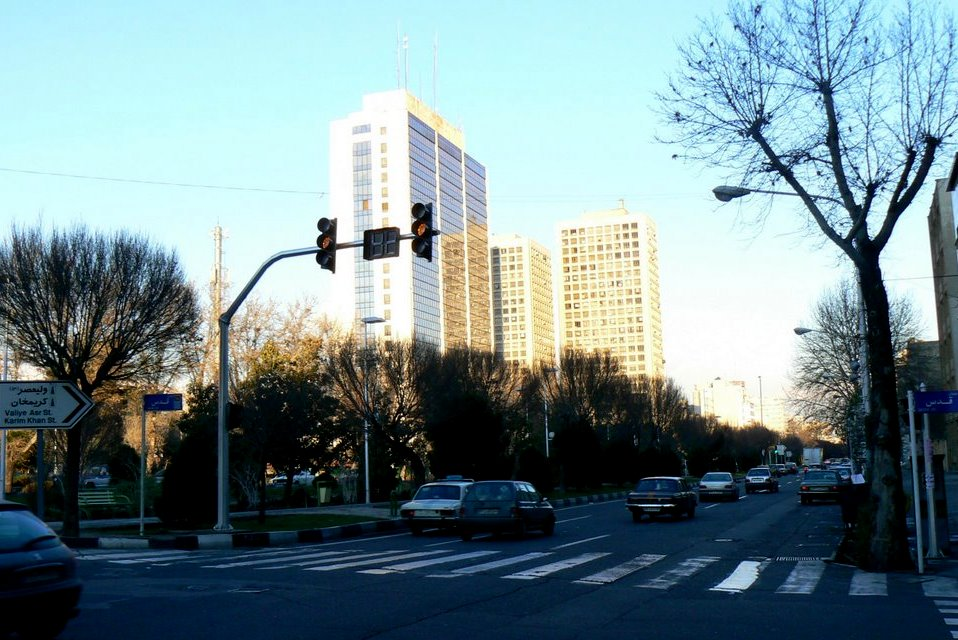
The former building of the Ministry of Agriculture of Iran

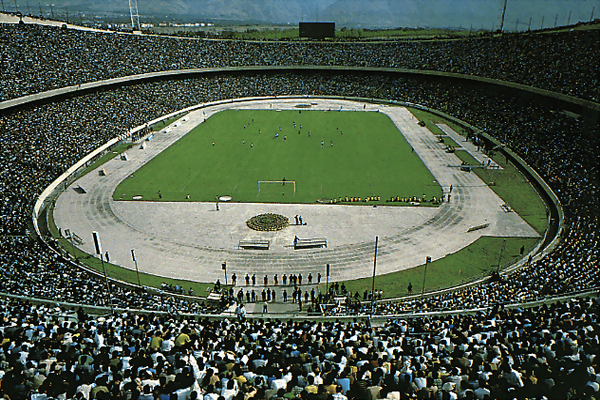
Azadi Stadium in Tehran

In 1975, AFFA's rating in the plan organization was ranked first in Iran as a design and engineering consultant organization.

=== Works ===
Office buildings

- Ministry of Agriculture, 22-storey headquarters office building, 1976
- National Iranian Oil Company Headquarters (in collaboration with Yahya Etehadieh), 13-storey office in Tehran, 1961
- Telecommunication Center, 2-storey tower in Tehran (sub-contract from Aneg), 1974
- Ministry of Roads, 14-storey headquarters building, 1959
- National Iranian Television Center, Studios, offices, and other facilities in Tehran, 1972
- Beh Shahr Group Office, Offices and other facilities, 1969
- Khaneh Center Commercial Complex, 3 three-story towers of 200,000 square meters, half finished,
- Bank Saderat Isfahan Branch Office, Banking facilities, 1978
- Bank Kar Building, 23-story building offices, 1960
- Bank Etebarat/Credit Lyonnais, Offices and banking facilities, 1968
- Oil Consortium Head Offices (in collaboration with Wilson, Mason and Partners), eight-story office building, 1960
- Cement Company Office, Built at the Plant, 1960

Tehran Olympic Center

- Track and field and football stadium, 100,000-seat stadium with all related facilities, with an artificial lake to the north of the complex, 1970
- Multi-purpose covered stadium (in collaboration with S.O.M San Francisco), 12,000 seats, 1979
- Covered swimming and diving pool (in collaboration with S.O.M San Francisco), 3,000 seats, 1974
- Office Building and press center, 1974
- Shooting range, handguns and rifles, 1974
- Trap shooting range, 1974
- Outdoor training fields, Hockey, track and field, 1974
- Outdoor tennis court and field hockey, for training purposes, 1974
- Connecting roads and bridges to the main Karaj road, 1974

Hosting projects

- Saman 1 apartment building, two 22-story towers with 170 apartment units, 1970
- Saman 2 tower apartment building, 3 thirteen-story towers, totaling 400 apartments, 1972
- Vanak Park Apartment Complex, 4 towers (6 & 20 storeys each), 1978
- Sarcheshmeh housing complex, 2,500 building units of single-family housing for the copper mining industry employees, 1978
- Polyacr residential community, Employee housing in 154 units, 1978
- Bid Boland housing project (U.I.O.E) (in collaboration with Yahya Etehadieh), 500 units of housing for the gas pumping station workers, 1968
- Khaneh Karaj, Different housing types recreational community, 1977
- Darya, Second Home Community 700 single-family, 1977
- Isfahan, Single-family detached homes, townhouses, and apartments, 1978

Palaces

- New Niavaran Palace, 1967
- Old Niavaran Palace renovation, 1967
- Queen Mother Tadj ol-Molouk's Sa'dabad residence, 1972
- Prince Mahmoud Reza's Sad-abad residence, 1965

Airports

- Mehr-abad Airport Expansions Program
  - Apron, 38 aircraft positions with underground service road and underpass network, 1972
  - Terminal N02, International passenger service facility, 1972
  - Terminal N03, Facilities for Hajji Pilgrims leaving and returning, 1970
  - Terminal N04, International passenger service facility, 1974
  - Government Pavilion, Reception areas, lounges, kitchen, and dining facilities

Educational buildings

- Iran education project (in collaboration with Scandiacnsuk Intl-World Bank Project), Master planning, site selection, design, and construction of 49 schools and colleges in 19 cities and towns in Iran, 1974
- University of Tehran
- Tehran School of Engineering laboratories, Electro-mechanical laboratories, 1965
- Atomic Energy Project for the University of Tehran, 1965
- Technical school auditorium, 500 Seats, 1965
- School of Agriculture Hydraulics Laboratories, 1958
- School of Agriculture residential facilities, 1960
- School of Veterinary Sciences clinics, 1967
- School of Science Atomic Research Center, 1959
- Residential buildings for students in Amir-abad, 1959
- Restaurants for students in Amir-abad

Health and hospital

- Social Welfare Organization, Office building in 5 stories, 1964
- University of Ahwaz Hospital, 300-bed facility with doctors' training center, 1965
- Iranian army general hospital, Tehran, 200-bed hospital with a major surgical department, 1968
- Hospital, Abadan (in collaboration with Wilson, Mason and Partners), 250-bed facility with orthopedics and rehabilitation center, 1959

; Miscellaneous

- Carpet Museum, 2 floors including an exhibition hall, research library, and carpet treatment facilities, 1978
- Iranian Pavilion, EXO 67, 8,000 square meter exhibition hall in a building with blue Isfahan tile exterior, 1957
- PIT postal sorting center (with the UK General Post Office), Automated central mail sorting complex, 1975
- Shemshak ski resort hotel, 30 rooms with sports resort facilities, plus restaurant and locker rooms

; Industrial buildings

- Arj industrial complexes, 20,000 square meter factory and shop facility, plus 5,000 square meters of office space, units of staff apartments, 1965
- Darou Pakhsh Group Pharmaceutical Plan (with Wilson, Mason and Partners), 20,000 square meters of plant, laboratory, and offices, 300, 1965
- Pfizer pharmaceutical center (with Wilson, Mason and Partners), 8,000 square meters of offices, 1965
- Squibb industrial offices (with Wilson, Mason and Partners), 7,000 square meters of offices, 1965
- Shopping center of the Iranian army, 20,000 square meters on 3 floors plus a basement level, 1966
- Telecommunication and earth satellite station for Northup Page Communications, 1970

Master plans

- Comprehensive master plan of Tehran (with Gruen Associates), 25-year growth plan and policies, capital improvement program, land use and development controls regarding direction of growth for a capital of 5.5 million population, arranged in 10 linear towns along an east–west axis, major rejuvenation of residential and southern sectors of Tehran
- Lavizan New Town, Master plan of 3,200 hectares for a 280,000 population community on the east axis of Tehran, 1977
- Sarcheshmeh Community, 2,500 units, Residential development for the copper mining industries staff, 1978
- Khaneh Community Development
  - Isfahan, 140-hectare development for a community of 15,000 persons, 1978
  - Darya, a Resort community on a 250-hectare extensive beach from
  - Karaj, Second home community for 700 single-family units on 63 hectares, 1977
- Greater Tehran Parking Study, Study of the potential for development of underground public parking structures in major squares throughout central Tehran, 1969
- Note 1: Between 1950 and 1965 construction of 100 houses for friends and family. Some of these houses have been destroyed. The residence of the Belgian Ambassador still exists.
- Note 2: Since 1955 up to 1970, all now basic work for Oil Operating Company (Consortium), as schools, houses, clubhouses, hospitals, clinics, etc., has been designed and built by AFFA and Wilson & Masons of London.
- Note3: Designed but not built, New Tehran International Airport-Terminal Building and about 100 different support facilities, (in collaboration with T.A.M.S New York), Construction of runways started in 1978
- Air Force Academy near Isfahan (in collaboration with S.O.M Chicago Office)
- Royal House Society and Hippodrome
- Central Bank of Iran and Crown Jewels Museum in Abbas-abad, Tehran

=== Tehran Master Plan ===
Partnered with the American firm of Victor Gruen Associates, Farmanfarmaian proposed his most important project, the Master plan of Tehran. This comprehensive plan, which was approved in 1968, identified the city's problems to be high density, expansion of new suburbs, air and water pollution, inefficient infrastructure, unemployment, and rural-urban migration. To deal with these problems, the consortium envisioned a 25-year planning horizon, which encouraged reducing the density and congestion of the city center through polycentric developments around Tehran. Eventually, the whole plan was 'marginalized' by the 1979 Iranian Revolution and the subsequent Iran–Iraq War.

== See also ==
- Azadi Stadium
