= Javid-e Mahuri Rural District =

Rural district in Fars province, Iran

Javid-e Mahuri Rural District Persian: دهستان جاويد ماهورئ
- Rural District
- Location within Iran
- Coordinates: 30°12′23″N 51°38′57″E
- Country: Iran
- Province: Fars
- County: Mamasani
- District: Central
- Capital: Muraki

Population (2016)
  - Total: 7,729
- Time zone: UTC+3:30 (IRST)

Javid-e Mahuri Rural District (Persian: دهستان جاويد ماهورئ) is in the Central District of Mamasani County, Fars province, Iran. Its capital is the village of Muraki.

== Demographics ==
=== Population ===
At the time of the 2006 National Census, the rural district's population was 9,122 in 1,977 households. There were 8,425 inhabitants in 2,288 households at the following census of 2011. The 2016 census measured the population of the rural district as 7,729 in 2,322 households. The most populous of its 65 villages was Muraki, with 1,893 people.
