= Fahlian Rural District =

Rural district in Fars province, Iran

Fahlian Rural District Persian: دهستان فهليان
- Rural District
- Location within Iran
- Coordinates: 30°11′28″N 51°27′44″E
- Country: Iran
- Province: Fars
- County: Mamasani
- District: Central
- Capital: Fahlian

Population (2016)
  - Total: 4,495
- Time zone: UTC+3:30 (IRST)

Fahlian Rural District (Persian: دهستان فهليان) is in the Central District of Mamasani County, Fars province, Iran. Its capital is the village of Fahlian.

== Demographics ==
=== Population ===
At the time of the 2006 National Census, the rural district's population was 5,163 in 1,220 households. There were 4,920 inhabitants in 1,330 households at the following census of 2011. The 2016 census measured the population of the rural district as 4,495 in 1,461 households. The most populous of its 14 villages was Fahlian-e Olya (Note: Now merged with Fahlian-e Sofla in the new village of Fahlian) with 1,487 people.
