= Jowzar Rural District =

Rural district in Fars province, Iran

Jowzar Rural District Persian: دهستان جوزار
- Rural District
- Location within Iran
- Coordinates: 30°17′N 51°41′E
- Country: Iran
- Province: Fars
- County: Mamasani
- District: Jowzar
- Capital: Mehrenjan

Population (2016)
  - Total: 7,037
- Time zone: UTC+3:30 (IRST)

Jowzar Rural District (Persian: دهستان جوزار) is in Jowzar District of Mamasani County, Fars province, Iran. Its capital is the village of Mehrenjan.

== Demographics ==
=== Population ===
At the time of the 2006 National Census, the rural district's population (as a part of the Central District) was 7,521 in 1,843 households. There were 6,830 inhabitants in 1,966 households at the following census of 2011. The 2016 census measured the population of the rural district as 7,037 in 2,280 households. The most populous of its 70 villages was Mehrenjan, with 1,508 people.

In 2019, the rural district was separated from the district in the formation of Jowzar District.
