= Bakesh-e Yek Rural District =

Rural district in Fars province, Iran

Bakesh-e Yek Rural District Persian: دهستان بكش يك
- Rural District
- Location within Iran
- Coordinates: 30°00′34″N 51°36′42″E
- Country: Iran
- Province: Fars
- County: Mamasani
- District: Central
- Capital: Gachgaran

Population (2016)
  - Total: 11,006
- Time zone: UTC+3:30 (IRST)

Bakesh-e Yek Rural District (Persian: دهستان بكش يك) is in the Central District of Mamasani County, Fars province, Iran. Its capital is the village of Gachgaran.

== Demographics ==
=== Population ===
At the time of the 2006 National Census, the rural district's population was 17,107 in 3,771 households. There were 11,484 inhabitants in 2,971 households at the following census of 2011. The 2016 census measured the population of the rural district as 11,006 in 3,271 households. The most populous of its 88 villages was Gachgaran, with 1,488 people.
