= Central District (Mamasani County) =

District in Fars province, Iran

Central District (Mamasani County) Persian: بخش مرکزی شهرستان ممسنی
- District
- Location within Iran
- Coordinates: 30°06′16″N 51°28′50″E
- Country: Iran
- Province: Fars
- County: Mamasani
- Capital: Nurabad

Population (2016)
  - Total: 98,816
- Time zone: UTC+3:30 (IRST)

The Central District of Mamasani County (Persian: بخش مرکزی شهرستان ممسنی) is in Fars province, Iran. Its capital is the city of Nurabad.

== History ==
After the 2006 National Census, the village of Khumeh Zar-e Sofla was elevated to the city of Khumeh Zar. In March 2019, Jowzar Rural District was separated from the district in the formation of Jowzar District.

== Demographics ==
=== Population ===
At the time of the 2006 census, the Central District's population was 97,206 in 21,208 households. The following census in 2011 counted 98,973 people in 26,209 households. The 2016 census measured the population of the district as 98,816 inhabitants in 29,160 households.

=== Administrative divisions ===
Central District (Mamasani County) Population
Administrative Divisions	2006	2011	2016
Bakesh-e Do RD	6,625	5,483	5,271
Bakesh-e Yek RD	17,107	11,484	11,006
Fahlian RD	5,163	4,920	4,495
Javid-e Mahuri RD	9,122	8,425	7,729
Jowzar RD (Note: Transferred to Jowzar District after the 2016 census)	7,521	6,830	7,037
Khumeh Zar (city)		6,095	6,220
Nurabad (city)	51,668	55,736	57,058
Total	97,206	98,973	98,816
RD = Rural District
