= Mamasani County =

County in Fars province, Iran

Mamasani County شَرسۊݩ مَمَسسَنی
- County
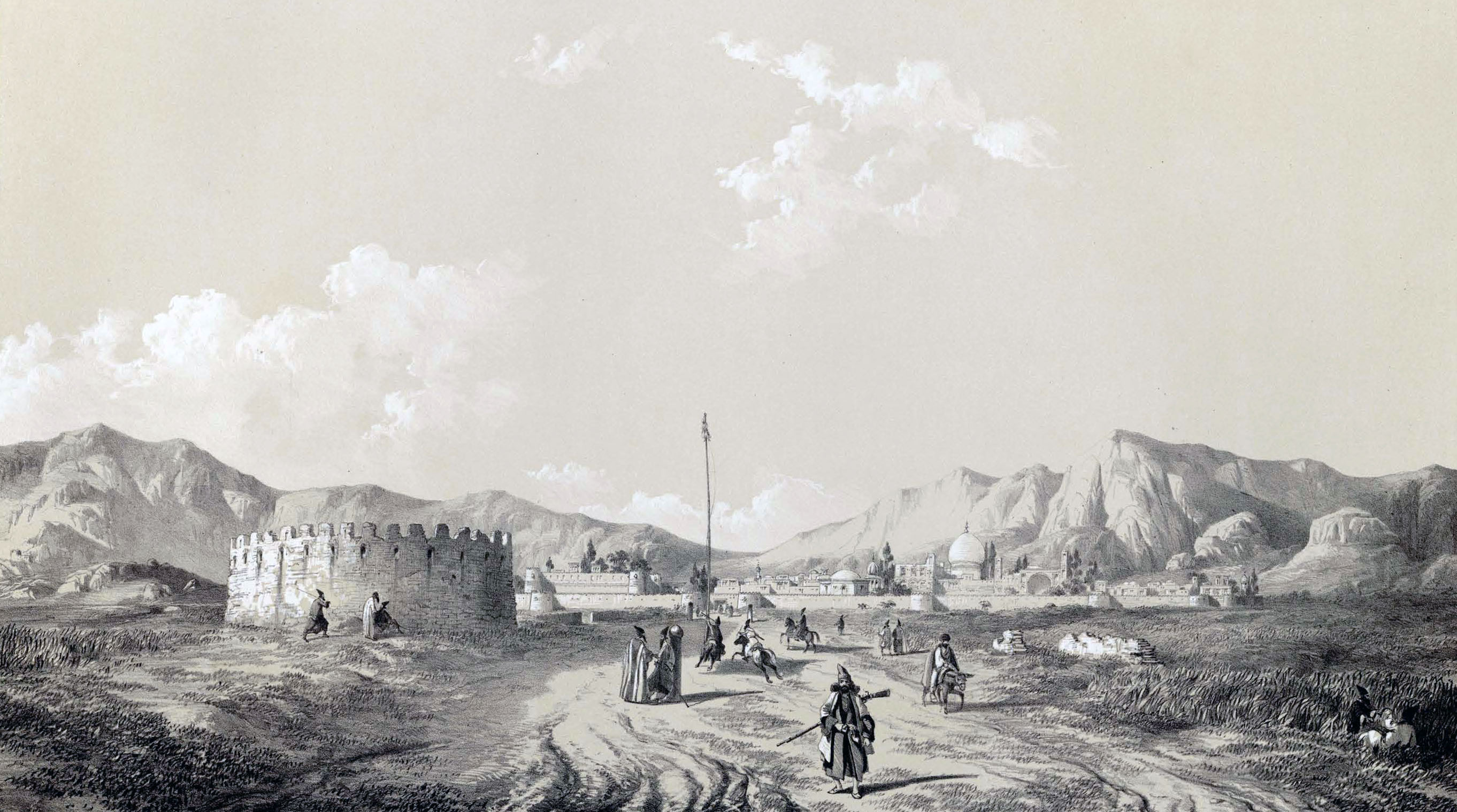
- Mamasani's Tower, by Eugène Flandin

- Location of Mamasani County in Fars province (left, pink)

- Location of Fars province in Iran
- Coordinates: 30°06′N 51°20′E
- Country: Iran
- Province: Fars
- Capital: Nurabad
- Districts: Central, Doshman Ziari, Jowzar, Mahur Milani

Population (2016)
  - Total: 117,527
- Time zone: UTC+3:30 (IRST)
- Website: https://radiomamasani.ir

Mamassani County (Persian: شهرستان ممسنی; Luri: شَرسۊݩ مَمَسسَنی) is in Fars province, Iran. Its capital is the city of Nurabad, 125 kilometers from Shiraz.

== History ==
After the 2006 National Census, Rostam District was separated from the county in the establishment of Rostam County. The village of Khumeh Zar-e Sofla was elevated to the city of Khumeh Zar. After the 2011 census, the village of Baba Monir rose to city status.

In March 2019, Jowzar Rural District was separated from the Central District in the formation of Jowzar District, which was divided into two rural districts, including the new Pereshkaft Rural District.

== Demographics ==
=== Language ===
The Mamasani (also Mohammad-Hassani) tribe also resides in this county and speaks the Mamasani dialect of the Luri language.

=== Population ===
At the time of the 2006 census, the county's population was 162,694 in 35,145 households. The following census in 2011 counted 116,386 people in 30,928 households. The 2016 census measured the population of the county as 117,527 in 35,060 households.

=== Administrative divisions ===
Mamasani County's population history and administrative structure over three consecutive censuses are shown in the following table.

Mamasani County Population
Administrative Divisions	2006	2011	2016
Central District	97,206	98,973	98,816
Bakesh-e Do RD	6,625	5,483	5,271
Bakesh-e Yek RD	17,107	11,484	11,006
Fahlian RD	5,163	4,920	4,495
Javid-e Mahuri RD	9,122	8,425	7,729
Jowzar RD	7,521	6,830	7,037
Khumeh Zar (city)		6,095	6,220
Nurabad (city)	51,668	55,736	57,058
Doshman Ziari District	10,196	9,463	9,326
Doshman Ziari RD	4,944	4,840	4,542
Mashayekh RD	5,252	4,623	4,784
Jowzar District (Note: Established after the 2016 census)			
Jowzar RD			
Pereshkaft RD			
Mahur Milani District	9,915	7,311	5,297
Mahur RD	5,614	4,892	2,251
Mishan RD	4,301	2,419	1,667
Baba Monir (city)			1,379
Rostam District (Note: Became a part of Rostam County)	45,377		
Poshtkuh-e Rostam RD	9,106		
Rostam-e Do RD	6,864		
Rostam-e Seh RD	9,525		
Rostam-e Yek RD	14,517		
Masiri (city)	5,365		
Total	162,694	116,386	117,527
RD = Rural District

== See also ==
Media related to Mamasani County at Wikimedia Commons
