= Chenar =

Chenar (Persian: چنار) may refer to:

- Platanus orientalis, the chenar tree, commonly known as the Oriental Plane or Old World Sycamore, depending on the dialect of English

== Ardabil Province ==
- Chenar, Ardabil, Iran
- Chenar, Angut-e Gharbi, a village in Germi County
- Chenar (39°07′ N 47°52′ E), Angut-e Sharqi, a village in Germi County
- Chenar (39°12′ N 47°41′ E), Angut-e Sharqi, a village in Germi County
- Chenar, Khalkhal, a village in Khalkhal County

== Chaharmahal and Bakhtiari Province ==
- Chenar, Kuhrang, a village in Kuhrang County
- Chenar, Lordegan, a village in Lordegan County

== East Azerbaijan Province ==
- Chenar, Ajab Shir, a village in Ajab Shir County
- Chenar, Meyaneh, a village in Meyaneh County

== Fars Province ==
- Chenar, Abadeh, a village in Abadeh County
- Chenar Zahedan, a village in Bavanat County
- Chenar, Tujerdi, a village in Bavanat County
- Chenar, Darab, a village in Darab County
- Chenar, Fasa, a village in Fasa County
- Chenar Shahijan District, in Kazerun County
- Chenar Barg, a village in Mamasani County
- Chenar Shahijan, Marvdasht, a village in Marvdasht County
- Chenar Pakaneh, a village in Neyriz County
- Chenar, Sepidan, a village in Sepidan County
- Chenar Mishavan, a village in Shiraz County

== Gilan Province ==
- Chenar, Gilan, a village in Shaft County

== Hamadan Province ==
- Chenar-e Olya, Hamadan, a village in Asadabad County
- Chenar-e Sofla, Hamadan, a village in Asadabad County
- Chenar, Nahavand, a village in Nahavand County

== Ilam Province ==
- Chenar Bashi, a village in Ilam County
- Chenar Bashi-ye Rezaabad, a village in Ilam County
- Chenar-e Allah Qoli, a village in Shirvan and Chardaval County

== Isfahan Province ==
- Chenar, Isfahan, a village in Kashan County

== Kerman Province ==
- Chenar, Kerman, a village in Shahr-e Babak County
- Chenar Turan, a village in Baft County
- Chenar-e Pidenguiyeh, a village in Jiroft County
- Chenar-e Kaf, a village in Sirjan County

== Kermanshah Province ==
- Chenar, Eslamabad-e Gharb, a village in Eslamabad-e Gharb County
- Chenar, Harsin, a village in Harsin County
- Chenar, Kermanshah, a village in Kermanshah County
- Chenar-e Olya, Kermanshah, a village in Kermanshah County
- Chenar-e Sofla, Kermanshah, a village in Kermanshah County
- Chenar-e Vosta, a village in Kermanshah County
- Chenar-e Sofla, Sahneh, a village in Sahneh County

== Khuzestan Province ==
- Chenar, Khuzestan, a village in Andimeshk County

== Kohgiluyeh and Boyer-Ahmad Province ==
- Chenar Rural District, in Dana County

== Kurdistan Province ==
- Chenar, Kurdistan, a village in Saqqez County

== Lorestan Province ==
- Chenar, Dorud, Lorestan Province, Iran
- Chenar, Keshvar, Lorestan Province, Iran
- Chenar, Sepiddasht, Lorestan Province, Iran
- Chenar, alternate name of Cham Davud, Lorestan Province, Iran
- Chenar-e Bala, Lorestan Province, Iran
- Chenar-e Dom Chehr Qoralivand, Lorestan Province, Iran
- Chenar-e Golaban, Lorestan Province, Iran
- Chenar-e Kaliab, Lorestan Province, Iran
- Chenar-e Mishakhvor, Lorestan Province, Iran
- Chenar-e Modvi-e Bala, Lorestan Province, Iran
- Chenar-e Modvi-e Pain, Lorestan Province, Iran
- Chenar-e Pain, Lorestan Province, Iran
- Chenar-e Razbashi, Lorestan Province, Iran
- Chenar-e Sofla, Lorestan, Lorestan Province, Iran
- Chenar Bagali, Lorestan Province, Iran
- Chenar Gerit, Lorestan Province, Iran
- Chenar Kheyri, Lorestan Province, Iran
- Chenar Khoshkeh, Lorestan Province, Iran
- Chenar Khosrow, Lorestan Province, Iran
- Chenar Kol, Lorestan Province, Iran
- Chenar Shureh, Lorestan Province, Iran

== Markazi Province ==
- Chenar, Khomeyn, a village in Khomeyn County
- Chenar, Saveh, a village in Saveh County

== Qazvin Province ==
- Chenar-e Sofla, Qazvin, Qazvin Province, Iran

== Razavi Khorasan Province ==
- Chenar, Chenaran, a village in Chenaran County
- Chenar, Dargaz, a village in Dargaz County
- Chenar, Fariman, a village in Fariman County
- Chenar Bow, a village in Fariman County
- Chenar, Kalat, a village in Kalat County
- Chenar, Mahvelat, a village in Mahvelat County
- Chenar, Sabzevar, a village in Sabzevar County
- Chenar, Torbat-e Jam, a village in Torbat-e Jam County

== Tehran Province ==
- Chenar-e Arabha, a village in Damavand County

== Zanjan Province ==
- Chenar, Zanjan, a village in Tarom County

== See also ==
- Çınar (disambiguation), the Turkic version of the word
- Chenaran (disambiguation)
- Chenaru (disambiguation)
- Chenaruiyeh (disambiguation)
- Dar Chenar (disambiguation)
- Deh Chenar (disambiguation)
