= Chenaran (disambiguation) =

Chenaran is a city in Razavi Khorasan province, Iran.

Chenaran (Persian: چناران) may also refer to:

- Chenaran, Ardabil, a village in Ardabil province, Iran
- Chenaran, Fars, a village in Fars province, Iran
- Chenaran, Golestan, a village in Golestan province, Iran
- Chenaran, Hamadan, a village in Hamadan province, Iran
- Chenaran, Kahnuj, a village in Kerman province, Iran
- Chenaran, Sirjan, a village in Kerman province, Iran
- Chenaran, Kangavar, a village in Kermanshah province, Iran
- Chenaran, Ravansar, a village in Kermanshah province, Iran
- Chenaran, Kurdistan, a village in Kurdistan province, Iran
- Chenaran, Lorestan, a village in Lorestan province, Iran
- Chenaran, Nishapur, a village in Razavi Khorasan province, Iran
- Chenaran, North Khorasan, a village in North Khorasan province, Iran
- Chenaran, South Khorasan, a village in South Khorasan province, Iran
- Chenaran, Tehran, a village in Tehran province, Iran
- Chenaran County, an administrative division of Razavi Khorasan province, Iran
- Chenaran Rural District, an administrative division of Iran

== See also ==
- Chenar (disambiguation)
