= Chenaruiyeh =

Chenaruiyeh or Chenarooeyeh or Chenaruyeh (Persian: چناروئيه) may refer to:

- Chenaruiyeh, Fars
- Chenaruyeh, Neyriz, Fars Province
- Chenaruiyeh, Ravar, Kerman Province
- Chenaruiyeh, Heruz, Ravar County, Kerman Province
- Chenarooeyeh, Shahr-e Babak, Kerman Province
- Chenaruiyeh, Zarand, Kerman Province
