= Çınar =

Çınar, also spelled chinar and çinar, is a Turkic word meaning Platanus tree (commonly called "plane tree" or "sycamore tree" depending on the English dialect), derived from the Persian word chenar (Persian: چنار), and may refer to:

== Places ==
=== Albania ===
- Çinar, Albania, a village within the rural town of Fier-Shegan in the county of Fier

=== Azerbaijan ===
- Çinar, Azerbaijan, village in Azerbaijan

=== Turkey ===
- Çınar, Akyurt, a neighborhood of the district of Akyurt, Ankara Province, Turkey
- Çınar, Diyarbakır, a district of Diyarbakır Province, Turkey

== People ==
- Çınar (surname)

== Other uses ==
- Çınar Incident, the name of a 17th-century rebellion in the Ottoman Empire
- Çınar Ağacı, a 2011 Turkish comedy-drama film
- Chinar, Russia, a rural locality in the Republic of Dagestan, Russia
- Chinar, alternative spelling of Chinor, a town in Tajikistan
- Chinar, a common name for Platanus orientalis, the oriental plane tree
- Chinar Corps, corps of the Indian Army in Jammu and Kashmir
- Chinar Kharkar, Indian music composer, part of the Chinar–Mahesh duo
- Chinar Park, a locality in Rajarhat, Kolkata, India
  - Chinar Park metro station
- Char Chinar (literally: Four Chinars), an island on the Dal Lake in Srinagar, India
- Chinar: Daastaan-E-Ishq, a 2015 Indian film set in Srinagar

== See also ==
- CINAR, a former production company
  - CINAR scandal
- Cinar, an iOS 11 codename
- Chenar (disambiguation), places in Iran
- Çınarlı (disambiguation)
- Chinari (disambiguation)
- Chinare (disambiguation)
- Chinaur, a village in Uttar Pradesh, India
- Chunar, a city in Uttar Pradesh, India
- Çınarlı
- Chinar Rustamova
- Darreh Chenar (Dar-i-Chinar)
