= Narlı =

Narlı or Narli may refer to:

== Places ==
=== Turkey ===
- Narlı, Balya, Balıkesir Province
- Narlı, Çatak, Van Province
- Narlı, Kale, Denizli Province
- Narlı, Laçin, Çorum Province
- Narlı, Mut, Mersin Province
- Narlı, Pazarcık, Kahramanmaraş Province
- Narlı, Sincik, Adıyaman Province

=== Iran ===
- Narli, Ardabil, a village in Kowsar County, Ardabil Province, Iran
- Narli Aji Su, a village in Maraveh Tappeh County, Golestan Province, Iran
- Narli Dagh, a village in Gonbad-e Qabus County, Golestan Province, Iran

== See also ==
- Narlıca, in Hatay Province, Turkey
- Narlıkuyu, in Mersin Province, Turkey
- Narlıq, in the Sabirabad Rayon of Azerbaijan
- Çınarlı (disambiguation)
