= Chenar-e Sofla =

Chenar-e Sofla (Persian: چنارسفلي) may refer to:

- Chenar-e Sofla, Hamadan
- Chenar-e Sofla, Kermanshah
- Chenar-e Sofla, Sahneh, Kermanshah Province
- Chenar-e Sofla, Lorestan
- Chenar-e Sofla, Qazvin
- Chenar-e Pain, Lorestan
