= Bagh-e Chenar =

Bagh-e Chenar or Bagh Chenar or Baghchenar (Persian: باغ چنار) may refer to:

- Bagh Chenar, Chaharmahal and Bakhtiari
- Bagh-e Chenar, Hormozgan
