= Chenar-e Modvi =

Chenar-e Modvi (Persian: چنارمدوي) may refer to:

- Chenar-e Modvi-e Bala
- Chenar-e Modvi-e Pain
