= Çınar (surname) =

Çınar is a Turkish name and surname. The word literally means Platanus tree. The surname may refer to:

- Ateş Çınar (born 1986), Turkish yacht racer
- Deniz Çınar (born 1984), Turkish yacht race
- Erdoğan Çınar, Turkish writer
- İlker Çınar (born c. 1968–1970), former intelligence agent of the Turkish Army
- Nilüfer Çınar Çorlulu (born 1962), Turkish Woman International Master of chess
- Nurhan Çınar (born 1994), Turkish female field hockey player
- Perihan Çınar (born 1994), Turkish female hockey player
- Sevgi Çınar (born 1994), Turkish female footballer
- Yıldıray Çınar (born 1976), Turkish comic book artist

== See also ==
- Çınar (disambiguation)
