= Chenar Shahijan =

Chenar Shahijan or Chenar-e Shahi Jan (Persian: چنار شاهیجان) may refer to:

- Chenar Shahijan, Marvdasht
- Chenar Shahijan District, in Kazerun County
