= Çınarlı =

Çınarlı, Çinarlı or Chenarli, a Turkic word meaning "place with plane trees", may refer to:

- Çinarlı, Bilasuvar, Azerbaijan
- Çinarlı, Khojavend, Azerbaijan
- Çinarlı, Qakh, Azerbaijan
- Çinarlı, Shamkir, Azerbaijan
- Chenarli, Iran, Iran
- Platani, Cyprus or Çınarlı, Northern Cyprus
- Çınarlı, Çanakkale, Turkey
- Çınarlı, Düzce
- Çınarlı, Mudanya
- Çınarlı, Mut, Mersin Province, Turkey
- Çınarlı, Sason, Batman Province, Turkey
- Çınarlı, Yüreğir, Adana Province, Turkey

== See also ==
- Chenar (disambiguation)
- Çınar (disambiguation)
