= Chenar-e Olya =

Chenar-e Olya (Persian: چنارعليا) may refer to:

- Chenar-e Olya, Hamadan
- Chenar-e Olya, Kermanshah
- Chenar-e Olya, Lorestan
