= Chenaru =

Chenaru (Persian: چنارو) may refer to:

- Chenaru, Fars
- Chenaru, Kerman
