= Nahil =

Village in Uttar Pradesh

Nahil Nahil Khas
- Location within Uttar Pradesh Location within India
- Coordinates: 28.1416°N 80.0145°E
- Country: India
- State: Uttar Pradesh
- District: Shahjahanpur
- Tehsil: Powayan

Government
  - Type: Gram panchayat

Population (2011)
  - Total: 6,074

Languages
  - Official: Hindi, Urdu
- Time zone: UTC+5:30 (IST)
- PIN: 242401
- Telephone code: 05844
- Vehicle registration: UP-27

Nahil (officially recorded as Nahil Khas) is a village in Powayan tehsil of Shahjahanpur district in the Indian state of Uttar Pradesh.

== History ==
Nahil has been historically associated with a landholding family of Katehria Rajputs in the Rohilkhand region. In the 1893 work The Golden Book of India, Sir Roper Lethbridge says that the family claimed descent from Rao Hari Singh, who had settled at Gola Raipur on the river Khanaut during the 16th century. According to the account, a farman issued by the Mughal emperor Shah Jahan in 1645 granted the zamindari of Gola to Rao Vikrama Singh, a descendant of Hari Singh. The family subsequently established itself at Nahil.

The Nahil family was historically regarded as the senior house of the Katehria thakurs of district shahjahanpur. According to H. R. Nevill's 1910 gazetteer, the landholding families of Khutar, Jiwan, Jatpura, Jalalpur and Bamrauli originated as offshoot branches of the Nahil house. The Khutar family, whose head traditionally bore the title of Raja, was identified as a younger branch.

=== Conflicts & connection with Pawayan ===
The Golden Book of India describes a series of conflicts between the Katehria landholders of Nahil and Pathan forces during the 17th and 18th centuries. It records that Rao Gopal Singh, a Katehria Thakoor of Nahil, was killed in an engagement, leaving his widow and two infant sons.

The history of Nahil is also connected with the emergence of the neighbouring Pawayan estate. In his book, Lethbridge recorded that a family of Gaur Rajputs entered Shahjahanpur district to assist the Rani of Nahil against the Pathans. As per this account, Gaur thakur Udai Singh led a second expedition and subsequently founded the town of Pawayan. The account identifies Raja Raghunath Singh, a great-grandson of Udai Singh, as the ruler of Pawayan at the time of the British acquisition of the territory in the early 19th century.

=== 19th & 20th century ===
An earlier 19th century account of Nahil described its zamindar as a Katehria Thakur bearing the title of Rao. It recorded that the family had formerly possessed much of the Pawayan territory before the expansion of the Gaur Rajputs estates, but that its remaining property had become comparatively small and heavily mortgaged. When the pargana of Pawayan was settled in the early 19th century, several villages remained under the possession of the Katehria landholders of Nahil and its related branch at Jewan

During the Indian Rebellion of 1857, the Nahil family was associated with the defence of Pawayan. Lethbridge credits Rao Jet Singh of Nahil with helping defend Pawayan against the forces of Ahmadullah Shah and with supplying provisions to British troops operating in the district. Historian R. C. Majumdar places the final confrontation between Ahmadullah Shah and the Raja's forces at Pawayan on 5 June 1858. Rao Dal Singh, born in 1842, succeeded his father Rao Jet Singh in 1884 and held the hereditary title of Rao. Lethbridge's 1893 account identifies his three sons as Bechu Singh, Jagannath Singh and Sardan Singh, and records Nahil as the family's principal place of residence.

By the early twentieth century, Rao Dal Singh held 4 villages and 2 fractional holdings in Pawayan pargana, comprising 3,266 acres assessed at Rs. 3,765 in land revenue. These formed part of a larger family property comprising 8 villages and six fractional holdings, covering 7,365 acres and assessed at Rs. 7,415. The Rao also possessed 4 small villages in the neighbouring Pilibhit district. A further report, published in 1934, recorded that Rao Sardar Singh had incurred debts and lost his landed property in Nahil. It stated that the Katehrias of Nahil, with the exception of a landholder named Choora Singh, had consequently become only nominal landowners. This marked a considerable reduction in the estate of a family that had formerly been among the principal landholding houses of the Pawayan region.

=== Literature ===
Nahil has a recorded association with Hindi literature. According to the Government of India's District Census Handbook: Shahjahanpur, Chandan Rai of Nahil composed several poems during the 18th century, the best known being Kesri Prakash. His grandson, Makrand Rai, was the author of another literary work titled Harya Ras. Both of the writers are mentioned in the handbook's account of the historical and cultural contributions of Shahjahanpur district.

== Demography ==
In 19th century the village was recorded as having a population of 2,940 As of the 2011 Census of India, Nahil had a total population of 6,074 residing in 1,110 households, consisting of 3,262 males and 2,812 females. Children aged 0–6 numbered 970, making up about 16% of the total population. Scheduled Castes accounted for 23.05% (1,400) of the population, with no Scheduled Tribe population recorded.

The village had a literacy rate of 70.00% in 2011, with male literacy at 76.74% and female literacy at 62.13%.

=== Economy ===
F. H. Fisher's 19th century account described Nahil as a large village situated on the metalled road between Pawayan and Bisalpur, approximately five miles north-west of Pawayan and twenty miles from Shahjahanpur. A market held twice weekly.

The 1910 district gazetteer recorded a population of 2,762 at the 1901 census, including 286 Muslims, alongside substantial communities of Katehria Thakurs and Brahmans. Pottery produced by the village's Kumhara community was identified as its principal local industry. The village possessed a post office, cattle pound & upper primary school, while markets continued to be held twice weekly Agriculture and farming is the primary occupation in Nahil. According to last 2011 census, out of 1,979 total workers in the village, 1,843 (93.13%) were classified as main workers, including 725 cultivators and 887 as agricultural labourers.

The gazetteer also describes a large and deep jheel (lake or seasonal wetland) to the north-east side of the settlement, whose overflow drained westwards into a tributary of the Khanaut river. Nahil covered approximately 2,878 acres, of which around 1,690 acres were cultivated, and was being assessed at Rs. 2,500 in land revenue.

== See also ==
- jewan
- khutar
- powayan
