= Chinari =

Chinari may refer to:

== Places ==
- Chinari, Armenia; a village
- Chinari, Azad Kashmir, Pakistan; a village
- Chinari, Khyber Pakhtunkhwa, Pakistan; in Mohmand District
- Chinari, Mureș County, Romania; a village in the commune of Sântana de Mureș

== Other uses ==
- Chinarism, the offshoot of Alevism
- Oberiu or chinari, a Soviet art collective
