= Jewan =

- Location of Jewan in Uttar Pradesh, India
- Coordinates: 28°03′59.3″N 80°09′26.8″E
- Country: India
- State: Uttar Pradesh
- District: Shahjahanpur
- Block: Powayan
- Established: around 1740s
- Founder: Raja Shambhu Shah

Government
  - Type: Gram Sabha
  - Body: Pradhan

Population (2011)
  - Total: 4,000 (approx)
- Time zone: UTC+5:30 (IST)
- Postal Code: 242404
- Vehicle registration: UP 27

Jewan is a village in Powayan tehsil, in Shahjahanpur district of Uttar Pradesh, India. Jewan is located on the bank of river Gomti near the village Agouna, 7 kilometres (4.3 mi) east from Pawayan and 35 kilometres (22 mi) from Shahajahanpur.

== Demography ==
It had in 1901 a population of 2133 persons, out of which 213 were musalmans and the rest being principally katehria rajputs and brahmans. In 1931 the total population was 1870 out of which there were 243 Muslims. According to the 2011 census, its population was about 4000.

== History ==
Nineteenth-century accounts identify Jiwan, also called Murtazabad, as one of the historical tappas (administrative subdivisions) of the Gola tract which comprised of 1484villages. Henry M. Elliot's 1869 compilation records that the Jiwan or Murtazabad tappa comprised 103 villages in and around year 1710AD.The history of Jiwan is associated with the Katehria Rajputs of Nahil. Roper Lethbridge's The Golden Book of India (1893) reports that a farman of Shah Jahan in 1645 granted the zamindari of Gola to Vikrama Singh, a member of the Nahil family's ancestral line. H. R. Nevill's later gazetteer gives a different account, referring to a sanad received by Bikram Singh from Aurangzeb in 1659.According to family tradition, around the 1740s, following a division of the ancestral estates, Raja Shambhu Shah, a descendant of Rao Bikram Singh of Nahil, assumed control of Jewan and established his authority over the area. When the pargana of Pawayan was settled with its Raja in the early nineteenth century, certain villages remained in the possession of the Katehria landholders of Nahil and Jiwan. In 1910, H. R. Nevill described Jiwan as a predominantly agricultural village, with Katehria landholders belonging to a younger branch of the Nahil family.A supplement to the district gazetteer, published in 1934, recorded that a village panchayat had been established at Jewan on 13 August 1931.. The history of family was also excerpted from the local district gazettes.

== Geography ==
It is located at 28°03′59.3″N 80°09′26.8″E, and its elevation is about 194 metres (636 ft) above sea level.

== Jewan kothi family ==
Jewan Kothi is associated with the Katehria Rajput landholding family of Jewan, a branch of the older Nahil family. The 1910 district gazetteer describes the connection between the Katehria landholders of Jiwan and Nahil, while a later account identifies the zamindar family with Jewan Kothi.

In August 1882, Baldeo Singh of Jewan was proposed by J. S. Porter, Collector of Shahjahanpur, for membership of the Pawayan Tahsil Board. A 1934 supplement to the Shahjahanpur gazetteer names Kunwar Durga Bux Singh as one of the principal zamindars of Jewan, alongside Raja Ajai Verma of Powayan.

A 2022 report identifies Kunwar Rameshwar Singh as a founding member of the Bharatiya Jana Sangh and the father of Kunwar Balvir Singh. The report states that Balvir Singh was elected a director of the Uttar Pradesh Provincial Cooperative Federation in 1990 and became vice-chairman of the Indian Farmers Fertiliser Cooperative (IFFCO) in March 2022.

Balvir Singh's son Anurag Singh served as the block pramukh (chairperson of the block panchayat) of Powayan, a position he held in 2015. A 2017 newspaper report described him as a former block pramukh. A 2022 report identified Anurag Singh as a district general secretary of the Bharatiya Janata Party, while a 2026 report associated him specifically with Jewan Kothi.A report in the Hindi newspaper Hindustan identified Kunwar Rakesh Kumar Singh, also known as Munna, of Jewan as a former member of the Shahjahanpur Zila Panchayat and a nephew of Balvir Singh. The report also noted his past involvement in the BJP district committee and reported his death in 2013.

== Economy and agriculture ==
Jewan has long been associated with agriculture. In 1910, H. R. Nevill recorded a village area of 1,984 acres, of which 1,315 acres were cultivated, and a land-revenue assessment of Rs. 2,520. A 1934 gazetteer supplement described the village as known for its brass utensils and recorded 1,343 acres under cultivation.

The Shahjahanpur District Census Handbook for 1961 recorded a market at Jewan on Tuesdays and Fridays, dealing principally in foodgrains, vegetables and cloth, with an average attendance of 300 people.

The 2011 Census village directory, recording land use as of 2009, listed approximately 898.9 hectares of net sown land, recorded as irrigated, out of a village area of 973.3 hectares.

== Plantation ==
The family of Jewan Kothi owns acres of farmland in Jewan and nearby villages, where crops like wheat, rice and sugarcane are grown. The family also owns mango plantation farms known as Mutua and Noudha, in the outskirts of Jewan. Math K Baagh is a part of the former mango farmland (which had 100,000 mango trees), which was later turned into crop-growing fields. It is also the personal crematorium site of the family. The family of Jewan Kothi also owns a multi-acre crop land called "Jhabar", which used to be a jungle with a very large lake, where royal elephants were brought to graze on long grass.

== Education ==
The 1910 Shahjahanpur: A Gazetteer recorded an upper-primary school in Jiwan, providing evidence of formal schooling in the village by the early twentieth century.

Government primary and upper-primary schools operate in Jewan, both appearing in records published by the Uttar Pradesh Jal Jeevan Mission. School directories additionally record government-aided Janta Poorv Madhyamik Vidyalay (established in 1981) and the government Junior High School, Jewan (established in 1985), both serving Classes 6–8.

Later schools recorded in Jewan include R. S. Shukla Smarak Shishu, an upper-primary institution listed as established in 2004, and Shiv Narayan Lal Primary School, listed as established in 2005. Vidya Academy Jewan, a privately managed school offering Classes 1–8, is listed as having been established in 2019.

At the secondary level, Jewan has Radhy Shyam H. P. M. Inter College (Classes 9–12) and Ramswaroop Shukla Memorial Higher Secondary School (Classes 9–10). Both appear in the Uttar Pradesh Madhyamik Shiksha Parishad's official list of recognised schools for Shahjahanpur district, under codes 1143 and 1162 respectively. School directories report their establishment years as 2000 and 2001, respectively.

The 2011 Census village directory, which recorded educational amenities as of 2009, listed one pre-primary, one primary, one middle and one secondary-school facility in Jewan; these figures describe conditions at the time, rather than the village's present number of schools. The 2011 Census counted 2,326 literate residents, including 1,353 males and 973 females.

For higher education, Kunwar Durga Baksh Mahavidyalaya at Jeva/Powayan is listed as an affiliated college of Mahatma Jyotiba Phule Rohilkhand University (college code 539).

== Gallery ==
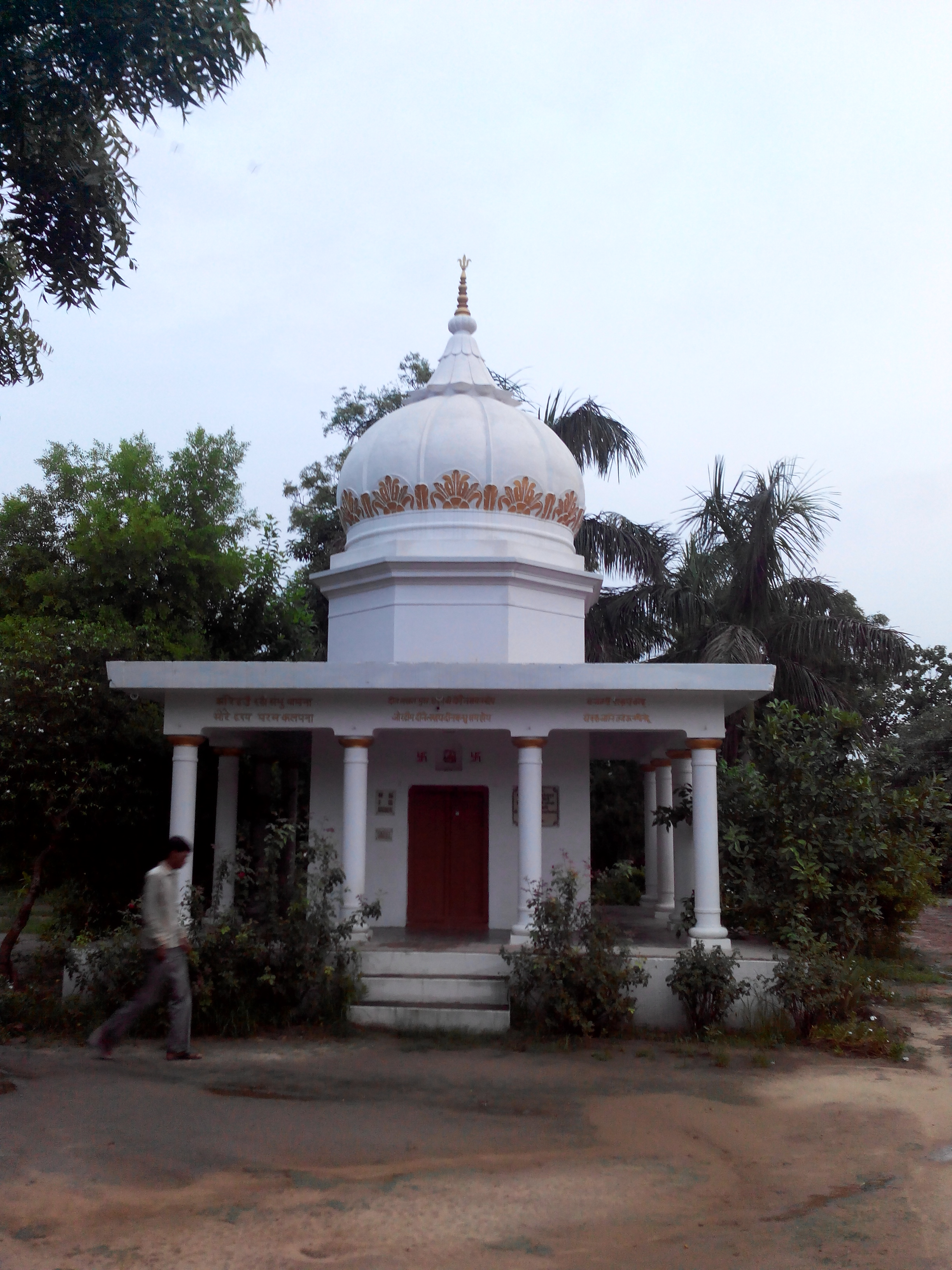
Kothi Temple

Barahdari

coat of arms

jewan village

Kunwar Durga Baksh Singh infront of old jewan kothi in 1930s

A 1938 gathering at jewan kothi featuring Kunwar Raghuraj Singh of khera bajhera,Raja Anand Singh of Kashipur,Raja Gajendra Shah of khutar,Thakur Rohan Singh and his son Shivmangal singh of rajepur beni,Kunwar Maharaj Singh of Pisawan,Kunwar Durga Baksh Singh,Ganga Baksh Singh,Visheshwar Baksh Singh,Rameshwar Singh,Jagdamba Singh,Devdutt Singh of jewan.

== See also ==
- Powayan
- Khutar
- nahil
