= Çatak =

- District and municipality
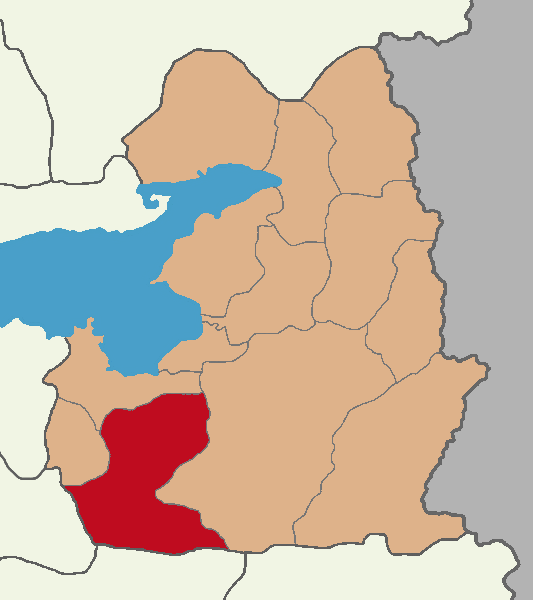
- Map showing Çatak District in Van Province

- Location within Turkey
- Coordinates: 38°00′31″N 43°03′35″E
- Country: Turkey
- Province: Van

Government
  - Mayor: Abdürrahman Şeylan (AKP)
- Area: 1,952 km^{2} (754 sq mi)
- Population (2022): 18,462
  - Density: 9.458/km^{2} (24.50/sq mi)
- Time zone: UTC+3 (TRT)
- Postal code: 65870
- Area code: 0432
- Website: www.catak.bel.tr

Çatak (Kurdish: Şax; Armenian: Շատախ, romanized: Šatax) is a municipality and district of Van Province, Turkey. Its area is 1,952 km^{2}, and its population is 18,462 (2022). Its inhabitants are Kurds. As mayor Abdürrahman Şeylan from the Justice and Development Party (AKP) was elected in the local elections in March 2019, Sercan Sakarya is the current Kaymakam, installed in August 2022.

== 2006 bomb attack ==
Two people were killed in a bomb explosion at an outdoor cafe in south-east Turkey, police stated on 4 September 2006. It followed a series of bombings in the last week of August 2006, at Turkish resorts and in Istanbul, that killed at least three people.

A separatist militant group, the Kurdistan Freedom Hawks (TAK), has said it carried out those attacks. Its website warned on 29 August 2006, that it would turn "Turkey into hell". The group, which is said to be linked to the outlawed Kurdistan Workers' Party (PKK), called on foreign tourists not to travel to the country. The group demanded that Turkish forces should withdraw from all Kurdish regions of southeastern Turkey.

Turkish media said a remote-controlled bomb in Çatak was detonated as police arrived to investigate a suspicious package. One of the two people killed was a police officer, the state-run Anadolu Agency reported. A local official said the bomb had been placed in a rubbish bin.

== Demographics ==
On the eve of World War I, before the Armenian genocide, the Armenian Patriarchate of Constantinople indicated that the town's population consisted of 1,096 Armenians (219 houses) and 9 Kurds (2 houses). Former Armenian prime minister Simon Vratsian's personal bodyguard, Torgom Der Mgrdichian hailed from Shadakh.

== Composition ==
There are 33 neighbourhoods in Çatak District:

- Adnan Menderes
- Ağaçlık
- Akçabük
- Alacayar
- Aşağı Narlıca
- Atlıhan
- Bahçelievler
- Bilgi
- Boyunpınar
- Çılga
- Cumhuriyet
- Dalbastı
- Derebaşı
- Dokuzdam
- Eliaçık
- Görentaş
- Hacıosman
- Işınlı
- Kaçıt
- Karşıyaka
- Konalga
- Korulu
- Narlı
- Onağıl
- Övecek
- Selçuklu
- Sırmalı
- Sözveren
- Sugeldi
- Teknecik
- Toyga
- Uzuntekne
- Yukarı Narlıca
