= Powayan =

- Town
- Location in Uttar Pradesh, India
- Coordinates: 28°04′N 80°06′E
- Country: India
- State: Uttar Pradesh
- District: Shahjahanpur

Population (2011)
  - Total: 50,000
- Time zone: UTC+5:30 (IST)

Powayan or Pawayan is a town and a subdivisional headquarters in Shahjahanpur district in the Indian state of Uttar Pradesh, 27 km from Shahjahanpur, 47km from Tilhar. It is located in the fertile agricultural belt of Northern India and is 300 km from Delhi and 200 km from Lucknow.

== History ==
Sometime after 1250 AD, one branch of Gaur Rajputs established kingdoms at Chandra, Maholi and Katesar in Sitapur in present Uttar Pradesh. A daughter of Chandra House of Gaurs was married to Rao Gopal Singh, the Katehria chieftain of Nahil. Rao Gopal Singh was killed in a battle by Rohilla Pathans and his widow sought the aid of her Gaur kinsmen on behalf her two infant sons. Thereupon Bhupat Singh and Himmat Singh of Chandra led a force into the district to re-establish the Katehrias at Nahil. Repeated attacks and disputes with the pathans compelled Bhupat Singh to send his son, Raja Udai Singh to Nahil's aid. Raja Udai Singh defeated the pathans at Deokali and established his Raj at Powayan. He established a Fortress at Powayan around 1746 AD and there after his descendants established Powayan as the largest Rajput Estate in Rohilkhand area. Legend goes that Powayan was established originally from east of Nahil or formed the Poorvaiyan chowk. Poorvaiyan over passage of time got distorted to Powayan or Powayan. With time the estate of Nahil lost luster and Puwayan flourished under the Gaur rulers. The title of ‘Raja’ is hereditary and was recognized by the colonial British in 1802 settlement where whole pargana of pawayan was setlled with raja except villages owned by katheria thakurs of nahil and jewan . The estate of the Tilakdhari Rajas of Powayan had 537 villages in Parganas of Powayan, Baragaon and Khutar.. The 9th and the last official Raja of Powayan was Raja Ajay Varma Singh, who established Powayan Inter college and donated land for many institutions for public welfare. His elder son Raja Surendra Singh was an independent MLA. The other two sons Raja Wg. Cdr. Abhay Singh and Raja Jai Singh continued their father's legacy. The present members of the erstwhile royal family, the 12th generation, maintain charitable institutions and enjoy a high repute in Powayan Tehsil.

The Powayan Tahsil is bounded on the south-west by Tilhar and Shajahanpur, south and east by Kheri district, north and west by Puranpur & Bisalpur tahsils of Pilibhit district. The total area of Puwayan Tehsil is 378,418 acres or 591 sq. miles. The language spoken is primarily Hindi with a dialect that is a mixture of Kanaujia and Braj. As per the census of 1901 there were a total of 5408 inhabitants, of whom 3776 were Hindus, 1384 Muslims and 248, other religions. A large fair was held every year on Dusshera and a smaller gathering known as Chhariyan takes place in the month of Chait. According to Bhadra's study of contemporary records, the severing of Ahmadullah Shah's head was carried out on the orders of Baldeo Singh. The head was presented to the British authorities at Shahjahanpur and publicly displayed outside the town's kotwali (police station). His body was burnt and its ashes disposed of in a river. Raja Jagannath Singh received a reward of ₹50,000 from the British government for Ahmadullah Shah's death.

=== Indian Rebellion of 1857–1858 ===
During the Indian Rebellion of 1857, Powayan, then under Raja Jagannath Singh, became involved in the disturbances affecting Shahjahanpur district, Rohilkhand and the neighbouring region of Awadh. The rebellion broke out at Shahjahanpur on 31 May 1857 and subsequently spread to surrounding towns and rural areas, including Powayan, historically also recorded as Puwanyan, Powain and Pawayan. Following the uprising at Shahjahanpur, British officials considered seeking refuge with the Raja of Powayan. According to historian Syed Mohammad Amir, the Raja declined to assume responsibility for their protection and advised them to seek shelter elsewhere.

The Raja's political position during the rebellion was complex. Historian Gautam Bhadra, citing contemporary British correspondence, records that Jagannath Singh maintained occasional contact with rebel forces while generally displaying an inclination towards the British government.

==== Death of Maulvi Ahmadullah Shah ====
Powayan became the scene of a significant encounter in June 1858 involving Ahmadullah Shah, a prominent leader of the rebellion in Awadh and Rohilkhand. Following the loss of his position at Mohammadi and the advance of British forces, Ahmadullah Shah moved towards Powayan. According to one historical account, he had expected assistance from Raja Jagannath Singh, while another nineteenth-century account states that the Maulvi attacked Powayan because the Raja had sheltered two Indian servants of the East India Company.

Historian George Dodd records that Raja Jagannath Singh, accompanied by his brothers Baldeo Singh (Buldeo Singh) and Komal Singh (Komul Singh), confronted Ahmadullah Shah's forces. According to this account, the engagement lasted approximately three hours, during which Ahmadullah Shah was shot and killed. His head was subsequently severed, and his remains were sent to the British authorities at Shahjahanpur.

A different account, discussed by historian Syed Mohammad Amir, describes Ahmadullah Shah arriving at the Raja's fort mounted on an elephant. Finding its gates closed, he reportedly attempted to force his way inside by striking the gate with the elephant. The Raja's defenders opened fire, and one of the shots fatally wounded him. In this account, the Raja's brother Baldeo Singh severed Ahmadullah Shah's head and carried it to the British authorities at Shahjahanpur.

Historical accounts differ regarding the exact date of Ahmadullah Shah's death. Amir dates the encounter to 5 June 1858, whereas Gautam Bhadra and George Dodd give 15 June 1858. According to Bhadra's study of contemporary records, the severing of Ahmadullah Shah's head was carried out on the orders of Baldeo Singh. The head was presented to the British authorities at Shahjahanpur and publicly displayed outside the town's kotwali (police station). His body was burnt and its ashes disposed of in a river. Raja Jagannath Singh received a reward of ₹50,000 from the British government for Ahmadullah Shah's death.

==== Rebel attacks and defence of Powayan ====
The killing of Ahmadullah Shah provoked hostility towards the Raja among rebel groups and landholders along the Rohilkhand–Awadh frontier. According to the historical account published as A History of the Sepoy War in India, several landholders regarded the incident as a betrayal and took up arms against the Raja. The British authorities consequently sent a military detachment, including cavalry under Lieutenant Charles de Kantzow, to strengthen the defence of Powayan. The Raja was also encouraged to maintain his own armed retainers, reported to number approximately 2,000 men, in readiness for further attacks.

On 8 October 1858, Powayan was attacked by another rebel force. The assault was repulsed by the Raja's forces. The engagement formed part of the continuing military resistance along the frontier of Rohilkhand and Awadh during the later stages of the rebellion.

The British Library preserves an archival record containing Lieutenant Charles de Kantzow's account of the rebel attacks on Powayan, their repulse by his troops and the subsequent withdrawal of the rebel forces across the border into Awadh. The file is preserved among the India Office Records under reference IOR/L/PS/6/495, Collection 76/282.

Another British Library archival record documents awards to four inhabitants of Powayan pargana for saving the lives of Sub-Assistant Surgeon Bani Madhab Tagore and his cousin during the rebellion.

== Pawayan Garhi ==
Pawayan Garhi (also known as Garhi Rajbhawan) is the historic residence of the Gaur Rajput Rajas of Pawayan in Shahjahanpur district, Uttar Pradesh. The family belonged to the Gaur Rajput clan and maintained hereditary landed estates in Rohilkhand and adjoining parts of Awadh. The Imperial Gazetteer of India (1908) recorded that the descendants of the founder of Pawayan continued to possess a substantial landed estate in the surrounding area. The Garhi has remained associated with the former ruling family into the twenty-first century.

=== The Gaur Rajput family ===
The Rajas of Pawayan belonged to the Brahm Gaur branch of the Gaur Rajput clan, whose related families held estates at Chandra, Maholi and Katesar in the neighbouring Sitapur district. The hereditary title of Raja was recognised by the British administration. The Pawayan Raj was traditionally an impartible estate, with succession governed by male primogeniture, under which the principal estate descended undivided to the senior male heir.

According to Sir Roper Lethbridge's The Golden Book of India (1893), Raja Raghunath Singh was succeeded in 1825 by his widow, who subsequently adopted Jagannath Singh. Following her death in 1850, Jagannath Singh held the hereditary title. He was succeeded by his nephew and adopted son, Raja Fateh Singh, on 17 May 1889. Fateh Singh, born on 10 October 1858, also served as an honorary magistrate. He died on 28 December 1921 and was succeeded by his eldest son, Raja Indra Vikram Singh. Following Indra Vikram Singh's death on 28 May 1928, his son Raja Ajai Verma became the senior representative of the estate.

=== Landed estates and properties ===
The Pawayan family possessed agricultural estates in Shahjahanpur district as well as properties in neighbouring Sitapur district. A 1915 entry in The Indian Biographical Dictionary recorded the Pawayan estate under Raja Fateh Singh as comprising 186 villages and 21 pattis in Shahjahanpur district. The entry also identified the family's connections with the Gaur Rajput houses of Maholi and Katesar.

The family also held property across the historical boundary between Rohilkhand and Awadh. The 1938 Privy Council judgment concerning the Pawayan estate recorded that the Gaur family had extensive connections with the Sitapur landholding families and that the Pawayan branch had acquired additional villages in Sitapur. These holdings were distinct from the principal Pawayan Raj in Shahjahanpur.

=== Wazirnagar estate ===
Among the family's properties outside Shahjahanpur was the estate of Wazirnagar in Sitapur district. The Gazetteer of the Province of Oudh (1877), in its description of Misrikh pargana, specifically identified Wazirnagar as the Sitapur residence of the Gaur Raja of Pawayan. It also recorded that a market was held there twice weekly.

The subsequent disposal of the Wazirnagar estate is recorded in Darogah Haji Abbas Ali's An Illustrated Historical Album of the Rajas and Taaluqdars of Oudh (1880). The work lists Raja Jagar Nath Singh, a Gaur Rajput hereditary Raja, in connection with Wazirnagar and states that the taluqa had been sold, although the Raja continued to hold property in Shahjahanpur district. This establishes that the Wazirnagar property had passed out of the family's possession by the time of publication.

A photographic portrait identified as Raja Jagar Nath Singh, Taluqdar of Wazirnagar, taken by Abbas Ali around 1880, is also preserved in the British Library collections.

=== Court of Wards administration ===
During the late nineteenth and early twentieth centuries, the Pawayan estate experienced financial difficulties. According to The Indian Biographical Dictionary (1915), the estate became heavily encumbered by debt and was consequently placed under the administration of the Court of Wards at the request of the Raja. The Court of Wards was a colonial institution responsible for supervising the management of certain landed estates, including those affected by indebtedness.

The same contemporary biographical record states that the estate was released from Court of Wards administration in 1906. It does not specify the exact date when the administration began or establish that the earlier sale of Wazirnagar was carried out by the Court of Wards.

=== Later history ===
Following the abolition of the zamindari system in Uttar Pradesh after Indian independence, the Pawayan family ceased to exercise the former proprietary rights associated with its zamindari estate. Members of the family subsequently participated in local civic and political affairs.

The historic residential premises continued to be known as Garhi Rajbhawan.

== Demographics ==
As of 2011 India census, Powayan had a population of 28,613. Males constitute 54% of the population and females 46%. Powayan has an average literacy rate of 65%, : male literacy is 65%, and female literacy is 52%. In Powayan, 15% of the population is under 6 years of age.

Powayan has an agriculturally based economy, as is the case with most of the towns in Uttar Pradesh. Powayan is also known in local areas for production and maintenance of agricultural equipment, with many families involved in such businesses. Powayan is also known as "Mini Punjab " of UP as a large population of this area are Sikhs and have progressed well.

== Notable people ==
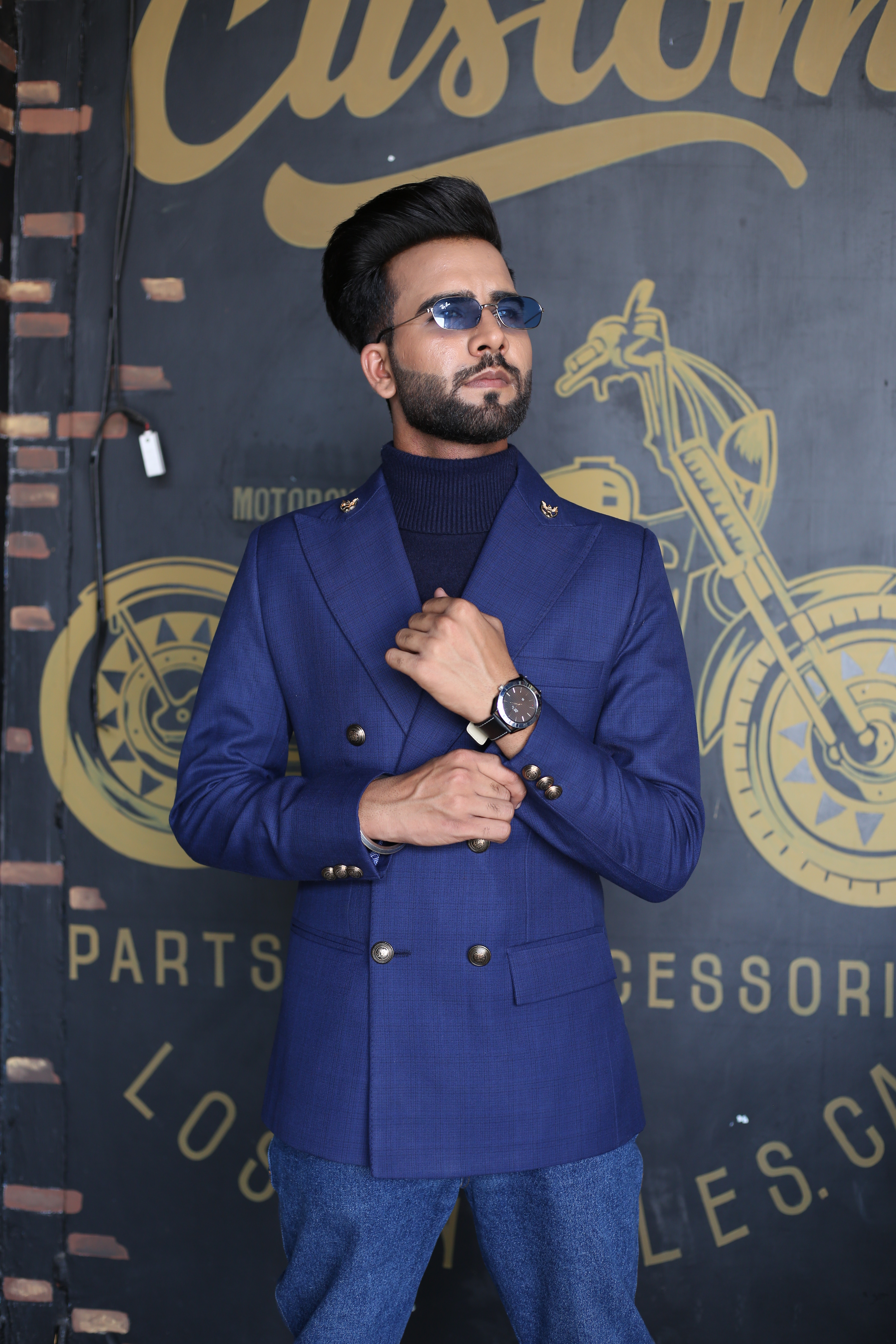
Hira Thind

- Hira Thind is an Indian singer and actor. He mainly works in Punjabi music industry. Thind belongs to Shahjahanpur, Uttar Pradesh.
- Raja Jagannath Singh – Nineteenth-century Gaur Rajput Raja of Powayan who ruled during the Indian Rebellion of 1857. He was the adopted son of the widow of Raja Raghunath Singh, the earlier ruler of Powayan. He is remembered for his involvement in the killing of the rebel leader Ahmadullah Shah at Powayan in June 1858, for which he received a reward of ₹50,000 from the British authorities. His brother Baldeo Singh also participated in the encounter.

Raja Fateh Singh

- Raja Fateh Singh (10 October 1858 – 28 December 1921) – Gaur Rajput Raja of Powayan who succeeded his uncle and adoptive father, Raja Jagannath Singh, on 17 May 1889. He served as an honorary magistrate. A contemporary biographical dictionary recorded that the Powayan estate comprised 186 villages and 21 pattis in Shahjahanpur district. The estate had been placed under the administration of the Court of Wards and was released in 1906. His sons were Raja Indra Vikram Singh and Kunwar Vijai Verma. His succession and family history are documented in The Golden Book of India (1893), The Indian Biographical Dictionary (1915), and subsequent judicial proceedings concerning the estate.

Raja Ajai verma with his wife and eldest son Rajkumar Surendra Singh

- Raja Ajai Verma (also known as Raja Ajay Varma Singh) – Raja of Powayan and eldest son of Raja Indra Vikram Singh. He succeeded his father following his death in May 1928 and is described in local historical reporting as the last hereditary Raja of Powayan before the abolition of the zamindari system Allahabad High Court in 1951.
- Raja Surendra Singh (also recorded as Rajkumar Surendra Singh) – Member of the former Powayan royal family and politician who was elected as an Independent member of the Uttar Pradesh Legislative Assembly from Powayan in the 1957 Uttar Pradesh Legislative Assembly election.He received 45,365 votes and represented the constituency during the second Uttar Pradesh Legislative Assembly (1957–1962). He also served multiple terms as chairman of the Powayan town board.
- Mithlesh Kumar (born 5 November 1964) – Indian politician and member of the Bharatiya Janata Party, serving as a member of the Rajya Sabha from Uttar Pradesh since July 2022. He previously represented Powayan in the Uttar Pradesh Legislative Assembly for two consecutive terms, first as an Independent candidate from 2002 to 2007 and subsequently as a Samajwadi Party candidate from 2007 to 2012. He was also elected to the 15th Lok Sabha from the Shahjahanpur Lok Sabha constituency in 2009 as a Samajwadi Party candidate.

== See also ==
- Khutar
- Jewan
- nahil
