= Silhua =

- Village
- Location in Uttar Pradesh, India
- Coordinates: 28.1978903°N 80.2425869°E
- Country: India
- State: Uttar Pradesh
- District: Shahjahanpur

Government
  - Type: Gram Panchayat
  - Body: Gram Sabha
- Elevation: 170 m (560 ft)

Population (2016)
  - Total: 4,500+

Languages
  - Official: Hindi
- Time zone: UTC+5:30 (IST)
- PIN Code: 242405
- Vehicle registration: UP 27

Silhua is a village and a Gram panchayat in Khutar block of the Shahjahanpur district in the Indian state of Uttar Pradesh.

== Geography ==
Silhua is a village located at 28.2°N 80.28°E. It has an average elevation of 162 metres (531 feet). Dudhwa National Park is 70 km away and Gola Gokarannath (Chota Kashi) is 25 km away.

Here peoples are mainly dependent on Agriculture and major crops grown in the area are Wheat, Paddy, Sugarcane, Maize. Also in some areas Mustard is also cultivated.

The Sugarcane produced here is either sent to Bajaj Hindustan Sugar Mill, Maqsoodapur or to nearby cane mill Shriram Khandsari Udyog.

== Demographics ==
As of 2001, according to the India census, Silhua had a population of apx. 4500. Males constitute 53% of the population and females 47%. Silhua has an average literacy rate of 21%, lower than the national average of 59.5%: male literacy is 68%, and female literacy is 52%. In Khutar, 18% of the population is under 6 years of age.

== About the Village ==
The majority population follows Hinduism with a higher percentage of General category.

The village has a religious pond named "Baavan Ganga" situated 1.4 km from populated area. It is said that water from 52 rivers was poured in the pond. There is also a temple of Lord Shiva near to the pond.

Recently, Gram Pradhan Shashi Devi initiated its development to make it better for tourists. There is also a statue of lord Hanuman in middle of the pond, one can go through there by bridge.

In 2023, A Panchayat Bhawan and Jan Seva Kendra was also established near to Baba Ramnath ki Madhi in the village.

The village has a government owned Composite School from class 1 to 8.

Also, there is Dynastic Succession of Gram Pradhan in the family of erstwhile Landlord.
