= Chinare =

Chinare or CHINARE may refer to:

- Chenareh, a city in Iran.
- China Re, a Chinese insurance company.
- CHINARE, the abbreviated expedition names used by Chinese Arctic and Antarctic Administration for both Arctic and Antarctic:
  - Chinese National Arctic Research Expedition
  - Chinese National Antarctic Research Expedition

== See also ==
- Chinar (disambiguation)
