= Dar Chenar =

Dar Chenar (Persian: درچنار) may refer to:

- Dar Chenar, Jiroft
- Dar Chenar, Kuhbanan
