= Chinaur =

Village in Uttar Pradesh, India

Chinaur is a small village located in Shahjahanpur Tehsil of Shahjahanpur district in Uttar Pradesh, India. According to the Census 2011 information the location code or village code of Chinaur village is 134348. It is four kilometer far away from shahjahanpur station, located between Shahjahanpur and Powayan dist. All sides of Chinaur are covered by Army Cant Shahjahanpur. As per the constitution of India and the Panchyati Raaj Act, Chinaur is administrated by the Head of Village, who is an elected representative of the village; people call him Sarpanch.

The village has total population of 3571, of which 1867 are males and 1704 are females, as per Population Census 2011.

According to the census, the average Sex ratio of Chinaur village is 913, which is higher than Uttar Pradesh's state average of 912. The child sex ratio, per the census, is 949, which is higher than Uttar Pradesh's average of 902.

The population of children between age of 0 to 6 is 569, which makes up the 15.93% of the total population of the village.

Chinaur village has a lower literacy rate compared to Uttar Pradesh. In 2011, the literacy rate of Chinaur village was 57.76% compared to 67.68% of Uttar Pradesh. Male literacy stands at 65.46% while female literacy rate was 49.26%.

== Caste Factor ==
Chinaur has a mixed population; mainly Other Backward Castes (OBC) are in majority. Minorities are also in good numbers, especially Christians. Schedule Caste (SC) constitutes 8.15% of the total population. There is currently no Schedule Tribe (ST) population out of the total population.
