= Khutar =

- town
- Location in Uttar Pradesh, India
- Coordinates: 28.2°N 80.28°E
- Country: India
- State: Uttar Pradesh
- District: Shahjahanpur
- Founder: Raja Gopal Shah

Government
  - Type: Nagar Panchayat
- Elevation: 162 m (531 ft)

Population (2011)
  - Total: 17,423

Languages
  - Official: Hindi
- Time zone: UTC+5:30 (IST)
- Postal code: 242405
- Vehicle registration: UP27

Khutar is a town and a nagar panchayat in Shahjahanpur district in the Indian state of Uttar Pradesh.

== History ==
Khutar was part of the then Nahil estate at the time of Rao Bikram Singh who was the then ruler of Nahil. It later came under the possession of Raja Ugra Shah after the division of property and power. During 1830s the khutar estate was under Raja Khushal Singh and during 1838 land settlement the whole khutar parganas was divided under khutar katherias clansmen.The present ruler of Khutar is Raja Vijay Shah Judeo (titles and kingdoms were abolished in 1971 by the Government of India).

== Khutar Garhi ==
There were two garhis in Khutar Purvi Garhi and Paschimi Garhi. However, now these are two wards. A famous Churi Wali Gali connects these both wards, this gali (street) has dense market in it.Purvi Gadhi served as the seat of the Katheria landholders of Khutar (historically also spelled Khotar) who held prominent local status in the region. According to the Gazetteer of the Province of Oudh, Khushal Singh of Khutar obtained the title of Raja, which was subsequently recognized as hereditary. During the Indian Rebellion of 1857, members of the Khutar Katheria family became involved in the regional conflict. According to the 1910 Shahjahanpur District Gazetteer, Lakhan Sah of Khutar proceeded to Bareilly and obtained a grant for the parganas of Khutar and Puranpur, actively siding with the rebel administration. Records from the Pilibhit District Gazetteer also note the involvement of Raja Khushal Singh's son during the same period. In the early 20th century, the estate and title were held by Raja Fateh Sah (also spelled Fateh Shah), the son of Mehram Shah. Following Fateh Sah's death by poisoning in 1910, the title passed to his young son, Gajendra Sah (Gajendra Shah), whose estate was placed under formal management during his minority. In the post-independence period, Raja Vikram Shah (also referred to as Raja Vikram Shah Ju Dev) of the Khutar royal family entered electoral politics and won the Powayan Assembly constituency seat as an independent politician in the 1962 Uttar Pradesh Legislative Assembly election. Garhi, also called the Fort of Khutar, is a multi-acre palace where descendants of the erstwhile royal family of Khutar's King khusshal Shah's descendants live. Currently, the family of Raja Vijay Shah and Rajkumar Raghvendra Shah lives there.

Khutar Paschim on the other hand belonged to chauhans of khutar.According to H. R. Nevill's Shahjahanpur: A Gazetteer (1910), the Chauhan landholding in Khutar recorded as an estate of six villages held by Thakur Bhajan Singh and other Chauhans of Khutar originally belonged to the Raja of Khutar and passed to the Chauhans as the dowry of a daughter of the Katheria house. Neighbouring district records in Kheri: A Gazetteer (1905) also record Jangi Singh among the zamindars associated with the old family of Khutar in Shahjahanpur.

In the post-independence era, Paschimi Garhi became a prominent local centre of the Bharatiya Jana Sangh under Kunwar Gajendra Ratna Bahadur Singh (popularly known as Lalua Sahab) of the Chauhan family, who established the party's unit in Khutar in 1960. During the Emergency, Lalua Sahab and his associates courted arrest, and senior leaders including Maharani Scindia and Sunder Singh Bhandari visited the garhi to address public gatherings. Following the formation of the Janata Party in 1977, he helped organise its local block leadership, though he never contested an election himself. After his death, the physical structure of Paschimi Garhi gradually fell into ruins and no longer stands. During Vinoba Bhave's Bhoodan movement, Rani Tajkunwari of the Khutar Chauhan family donated 383 acres of land in the village of Simra Veeran; the land later became the site of a government cow shelter (Rajkiya Gosadan).Rani Tajkunwari was the wife of Jangi Singh and a daughter of the Katheria house of Jewan.

== Surroundings ==
The surrounding nearby villages and their distances from Khutar are as follows:

1. Lalpur (3 km) located about 3 km from Khutar, between Mailani and Puranpur roads
2. Silhua (2 km),
3. Pipariya Bhagwant (3.5 km),
4. Shihura Khurd Kalan (8 km),
5. Rajmana (2.6 km),
6. Malika (2.7 km),
7. Rautapur Kalan (3 km),
8. Itauwa (3.1 km),
9. Athkona (3.5 km),
10. Tah Khurd Kalan (4.1 km),
11. Piparia Birsinghpur (4.2 km),
12. Raswan Kalan (4.5 km),
13. Kuiyan (5.1 km),
14. Nawazpur (5.2 km),
15. Chamra Bojhi (5.4 km),
16. Garhia Sareli (5.8 km),
17. Lakshmipur (6.1 km),
18. Gurghiya (6.5 km),
19. Chappa Bojhi (7.3 km),
20. Muradpur Nibiakhera (7.8 km),
21. Karhaiya (8.7 km),
22. Sihura Khurd Kalan (8.8 km),
23. Saharu Singhpur (9.1 km),
24. Todarpur T. Khutar (9.3 km),
25. Dhansinghpur (11.6 km),
26. Sarai (11.7 km),
27. Navadia Nawazpur (13.3 km),
28. Larti (13.6 km),
29. Harraipur (13.6 km),
30. Kolhugarha (15 km),
31. Barhaipur (16 km),
32. Harnahai (16 km),
33. Bela (17 km),
34. Jadhopur Kalan (17.5 km),
35. Hanshpur (17.6 km),
36. Navadia Darudgara (17.9 km),
37. Khandsar (5 km).
38. Saufary (1 km)

== Famous Places ==
Some of famous nearby places are:

1. Shivaji water park & resorts (near village saufri).
2. SRC Water Park and Party Lawn(near village saufri).
3. Ramjanki Balaji Dhaam (popularlyMaa Panthwari mandir).

== Party Lawns ==
Some of famous party lawns in Khutar are:

- Shri Lalaram Marriage Lawn
- Nandlal Palace.
- Aashirwad Palace.
- Sagun Marriage lawn.
- Kartar Palace.
- Shri Radha Madhav Hotel & Resort

== Education Institutes ==
Prominent Education Institutes here are:

1. SLR Public School Tikuniya Khutar
2. PTL Christ Academy, Khutar.
3. Golden Flower Public School, Khutar.
4. LSP Public School, Village Rampur, Khutar.
5. Vitoli Devi Degree College.

and many more schools and colleges.

== Gallery ==
Rajas of Khutar:

Fateh shah of khutar

Gajendra shah

Raja Vikram Shah

Raja Vijay Shah Present head

== Geography ==
Khutar is located at 28.2°N 80.28°E. It has an average elevation of 162 metres (531 feet). Dudhwan National Park is 70 km away and Gola Gokhran Nath (Chota Kashi) is 25 km away.

== Demographics ==
As of 2001's Indian census, Khutar had a population of 17,423. Males constitute 52.6% of the population and females 47.4%. Khutar has an average literacy rate of 66.73%, lower than the state average of 67.68%: male literacy is 74.07%, and female literacy is 58.59%. In Khutar, 18% of the population is under 6 years of age.

== See also ==
- Jewan
- Powayan
- nahil
