= Bagh-e Chenar, Hormozgan =

Bagh-e Chenar باغ چنار
- Village
- Location within Iran
- Coordinates: 28°11′38″N 56°48′35″E
- Country: Iran
- Province: Hormozgan
- County: Hajjiabad
- Bakhsh: Ahmadi
- Rural District: Kuh Shah

Population (2006)
  - Total: 190
- Time zone: UTC+3:30 (IRST)
  - Summer (DST): UTC+4:30 (IRDT)

Bagh-e Chenar (Persian: باغ چنار, also Romanized as Bāgh-e Chenār and Bāghchenār) is a village in Kuh Shah Rural District, Ahmadi District, Hajjiabad County, Hormozgan Province, Iran. At the 2006 census, its population was 190, in 53 families.
