= Ishikism =

New syncretic religious movement among Alevis

Ishikism (Işıkçılık), also known as Çinarism (Çınarcılık), is a new syncretic religious movement among Alevis who have developed an alternative understanding of Alevism and its history. These alternative interpretations and beliefs were inspired by Turkish writer Erdoğan Çınar with the publication of his book Aleviliğin Gizli Tarihi (The Secret History of Alevism) in 2004.

== Işık faith ==
While mainstream Alevis believe the term Alevi means "follower of Ali", as in the Arabic word ‘Alawī (علوي), and consider themselves followers of the teachings and practices of 13th-century Alevi saint Haji Bektash Veli, Ishik believe differently. The Ishik movement claim that the term "Alevi" is derived from the old Anatolian Luvians, claiming that the word "Luvi" means "People of Light" in the Hittite language. Some Ottoman documents from the 16th century refer to the ancestors of today's Alevis as "Işık Taifesi", meaning "People of Light". This is, according to Ishikīs, a proof of the connection between the Luvians and Alevis.

A shared cultural history of that nature relates to common folklore describing the invention of agriculture by plant domestication. Wheat is assumed to have been first cultured in the northern part of the Middle East; and likewise, regional peoples shared a culinary tradition in the types of vegetables they consume.

=== Self-image ===
Ishikīs consider themselves to be esotericists, claiming that Alevism is esotericism itself, meaning that they identify themselves with every type of esotericism in history (e.g. Jewish esotericists, Christian esotericists, Islamic and Pagan esotericism etc.)

They claim that Alevism is the oldest religion in the world, that has changed shapes throughout time. This "First and True Religion" of the world, is claimed to have been the main source for all other religions and beliefs in the world:

It has now been brought into the open with all its truth, that Alevism, with its tens of thousands of years of history, has influenced all beliefs and has been the Original Source (the so-called "Serçeşme" – meaning "Beginning Spot of Fountain") of the celestial religions.

— Erdoğan Çınar in: Aleviliğin Gizli Tarihi, 2004.

The Ishikīs also claim that the religious ceremonies practiced by Alevis were practiced as early as by the Hittites and even by the Sumerians. According to Ishikīs, medieval Christian sects as Paulicianism, Bogomilism etc. were also Alevis. A good example of this belief can be found in the translation of the book The Cathars: The Most Successful Heresy of the Middle Ages (2005) by Sean Martin. Even though the original English version does not contain the word "Alevi", the Turkish translator has translated the title of the book as Ortaçağ'da Avrupa'da Alevi Hareketi – Katharlar (An Alevi Movement in The Middle Ages – The Cathars).

=== Historical beliefs ===
Compared to traditional Alevism, the most striking differences of the Ishik movement are their interpretation of history. The Ishik movement claims that Alevis have changed their apparent identity several times in history in order to survive. According to Ishikī belief, heretic sects like the Paulicians and Bogomils were actually Alevis compelled to appear as Christians because of the Byzantine oppression. Likewise the modern Alevis have gained an Islamic appearance because of the Ottoman oppression.

For example, they view circumcision as a foreign practice that does not belong to Alevism, tracing its origin to the Torah rather than to Alevi belief. They regard it as a form of taqiya adopted under pressure and argue that it conflicts with Alevi ethics and human rights, as it involves the permanent alteration of a child’s body without consent; as a result, most Ishikīs today no longer circumcise their newborn boys.

Ishikī thought is convinced that most heterodox groups are inventions as a result of oppression, meaning that groups like the Nizārī Ismā'īlī, Bektashism, Nusayrī Alawism, Ghulāt and Ahl-e Haqq are in reality separate from real Islam.

== Criticism ==
The Ishikī versus Traditionalist split has caused a deep gap in Alevi society. This is the first time in centuries that Alevis have experienced such a great split in terms of beliefs.

- Traditionalist Alevis have strongly opposed the Ishikīs, who they consider are people who are creating a completely new religion, or sometimes as undercover agents, trying to disrupt Alevi unity. Ishikīs are also criticized for being extremely political and for abandoning fundamental Alevi sources, such as the Buyruks, one of the most known written source among Alevis.
- The Alevi historian, Hamza Aksüt, responded to the works of Erdoğan Çınar in several articles, criticizing him for being intentionally manipulative and highly conspirational. were officially given as a reply to the interview with Erdoğan Çınar: Çınar'dan uyarı: 'Her flörtün sonu evlilikle bitmez' (Warning from Çınar: 'Not all flirts end with marriage'). Another writer, Ünsal Öztürk has also criticized Erdoğan Çınar. In 2010 Hamza Aksüt, Hasan Harmancı and Ünsal Öztürk went together in publishing the book Alevi Tarih Yazımında Skandal – Erdoğan Çınar Örneği (A Scandal in Alevi History Writing – The Erdoğan Çınar Example), which is an analysis and explaining of the claimed manipulation and "tampering" made by Erdoğan Çınar.
- Erdoğan Çınar received much criticism from Alevis and Alevi Dedes (for example Baki Güngör dede, who claim that Çınar's book is full of misconceptions and contradictions and consider it as yet another attempt of "Yol-Yezidiler" (enemies of the path of their tariqa) to assimilate the Alevis and to separate them from the mystic teachings of Haji Bektash Veli, Pir Sultan Abdal, Yunus Emre and The Twelve Imams.
- Some traditionalists have even gone so far as to demand that Ishikī dedes like Hasan Kılavuz should get the penalty of social exclusion.

== Ishikī organizations ==
The Ishik movement has succeeded in becoming very influential in important and powerful Alevi organizations. The Alevi Confederation of Europe (AABK) for instance, has abandoned its traditional Alevi beliefs in 2006, which it replaced with a marginal Ishikī type of understanding.

== See also ==
- Qizilbash
- Kurdish Alevism
- Yazdânism
- Yazidism
