= Chenar, Kermanshah =

Village in Kermanshah, Iran

Chenar چنار
- Village
- Location within Iran
- Coordinates: 33°59′26″N 47°22′17″E
- Country: Iran
- Province: Kermanshah
- County: Kermanshah
- Bakhsh: Firuzabad
- Rural District: Sar Firuzabad

Population (2006)
  - Total: 29
- Time zone: UTC+3:30 (IRST)
  - Summer (DST): UTC+4:30 (IRDT)

Chenar (Persian: چنار, also Romanized as Chenār) is a village in Sar Firuzabad Rural District, Firuzabad District, Kermanshah County, Kermanshah Province, Iran. According to the 2006 census, its population was 29, in 5 families.
