= Chenar, Dorud =

Village in Lorestan, Iran

Chenar چنار
- Village
- Location within Iran
- Coordinates: 33°22′54″N 49°00′56″E
- Country: Iran
- Province: Lorestan
- County: Dorud
- Bakhsh: Central
- Rural District: Dorud

Population (2006)
  - Total: 239
- Time zone: UTC+3:30 (IRST)
  - Summer (DST): UTC+4:30 (IRDT)

Chenar (Persian: چنار, also Romanized as Chenār; also known as Darreh Chenār) is a village in Dorud Rural District, in the Central District of Dorud County, Lorestan Province, Iran. At the 2006 census, its population was 239, in 44 families.
