= Chenar-e Kaf =

Chenar-e Kaf چناركف
- Village
- Location within Iran
- Coordinates: 29°37′12″N 56°18′00″E
- Country: Iran
- Province: Kerman
- County: Sirjan
- Bakhsh: Central
- Rural District: Chahar Gonbad

Population (2006)
  - Total: 39
- Time zone: UTC+3:30 (IRST)
  - Summer (DST): UTC+4:30 (IRDT)

Chenar-e Kaf (Persian: چناركف, also Romanized as Chenār-e Kaf) is a village in Chahar Gonbad Rural District, in the Central District of Sirjan County, Kerman Province, Iran. At the 2006 census, its population was 39, in 9 families.
