= Chenar Barg =

Village in Fars, Iran

Chenar Barg چناربرگ
- Village
- Location within Iran
- Coordinates: 30°20′01″N 51°37′32″E
- Country: Iran
- Province: Fars
- County: Mamasani
- Bakhsh: Central
- Rural District: Jowzar

Population (2006)
  - Total: 95
- Time zone: UTC+3:30 (IRST)
  - Summer (DST): UTC+4:30 (IRDT)

Chenar Barg (Persian: چناربرگ, also Romanized as Chenār Barg; also known as Chenār Barg-e 'Olyā) is a village in Jowzar Rural District, in the Central District of Mamasani County, Fars province, Iran. At the 2006 census, its population was 95, in 23 families.
