= Chenar-e Vosta =

Chenar-e Vosta چناروسطي
- Village
- Location within Iran
- Coordinates: 33°55′45″N 47°07′21″E
- Country: Iran
- Province: Kermanshah
- County: Kermanshah
- Bakhsh: Firuzabad
- Rural District: Jalalvand

Population (2006)
  - Total: 115
- Time zone: UTC+3:30 (IRST)
  - Summer (DST): UTC+4:30 (IRDT)

Chenar-e Vosta (Persian: چناروسطي, also Romanized as Chenār Vosţá) is a village in Jalalvand Rural District, Firuzabad District, Kermanshah County, Kermanshah Province, Iran. At the 2006 census, its population was 115, in 21 families.
