= Chenar Mishavan =

Chenar Mishavan چنارميشوان
- Village
- Location within Iran
- Coordinates: 29°18′42″N 52°25′23″E
- Country: Iran
- Province: Fars
- County: Shiraz
- Bakhsh: Central
- Rural District: Siyakh Darengun

Population (2006)
  - Total: 683
- Time zone: UTC+3:30 (IRST)
  - Summer (DST): UTC+4:30 (IRDT)

Chenar Mishavan (Persian: چنارميشوان, also Romanized as Chenār Mīshavān; also known as Chenār Mashavān, Chenār Mishāūn, Chenār Mīshūn, and Mīshavān) is a village in Siyakh Darengun Rural District, in the Central District of Shiraz County, Fars province, Iran. At the 2006 census, its population was 683, in 153 families.
