= Chenar-e Bala, Kuhdasht =

Chenar-e Bala چناربالا/ چنارعليا آزادبخت
- Village
- Location within Iran
- Coordinates: 33°30′44″N 47°36′09″E
- Country: Iran
- Province: Lorestan
- County: Kuhdasht
- Bakhsh: Central
- Rural District: Kuhdasht-e Jonubi

Population (2006)
  - Total: 339
- Time zone: UTC+3:30 (IRST)
  - Summer (DST): UTC+4:30 (IRDT)

Chenar-e Bala (Persian: چناربالا, also Romanized as Chenār-e Bālā; also known as Chenār-e ʿOlyā Āzādbakht) is a village in Kuhdasht-e Jonubi Rural District, in the Central District of Kuhdasht County, Lorestan Province, Iran. At the 2006 census, its population was 339, in 65 families.
