= Chenar-e Pidenguiyeh =

Chenar-e Pidenguiyeh چنارپيدنگوئيه
- Village
- Location within Iran
- Coordinates: 28°48′30″N 57°56′07″E
- Country: Iran
- Province: Kerman
- County: Jiroft
- Bakhsh: Jebalbarez
- Rural District: Saghder

Population (2006)
  - Total: 15
- Time zone: UTC+3:30 (IRST)
  - Summer (DST): UTC+4:30 (IRDT)

Chenar-e Pidenguiyeh (Persian: چنارپيدنگوئيه, also Romanized as Chenār-e Pīdengū’īyeh; also known as Pīdangū’īyeh and Pīdengū’īyeh) is a village in Saghder Rural District, Jebalbarez District, Jiroft County, Kerman province, Iran. At the 2006 census, its population was 15, in 5 families.
