= Chenar-e Razbashi =

Chenar-e Razbashi چناررازباشي
- Village
- Location within Iran
- Coordinates: 33°42′04″N 48°26′45″E
- Country: Iran
- Province: Lorestan
- County: Khorramabad
- Bakhsh: Bayravand
- Rural District: Beyranvand-e Shomali

Population (2006)
  - Total: 62
- Time zone: UTC+3:30 (IRST)
  - Summer (DST): UTC+4:30 (IRDT)

Chenar-e Razbashi (Persian: چناررازباشي, also Romanized as Chenār-e Rāzbāshī; also known as Chenār, Rāzbāshī, Rāzbāshī Chenār, and Rāzbāshī-ye 'Olyā) is a village in Beyranvand-e Shomali Rural District, Bayravand District, Khorramabad County, Lorestan province, Iran. At the 2006 census, its population was 62, in 14 families.
