= Chenar Khoshkeh =

Chenar Khoshkeh چنارخشكه
- Village
- Location within Iran
- Coordinates: 33°21′23″N 48°30′55″E
- Country: Iran
- Province: Lorestan
- County: Khorramabad
- Bakhsh: Central
- Rural District: Kakasharaf

Population (2006)
  - Total: 184
- Time zone: UTC+3:30 (IRST)
  - Summer (DST): UTC+4:30 (IRDT)

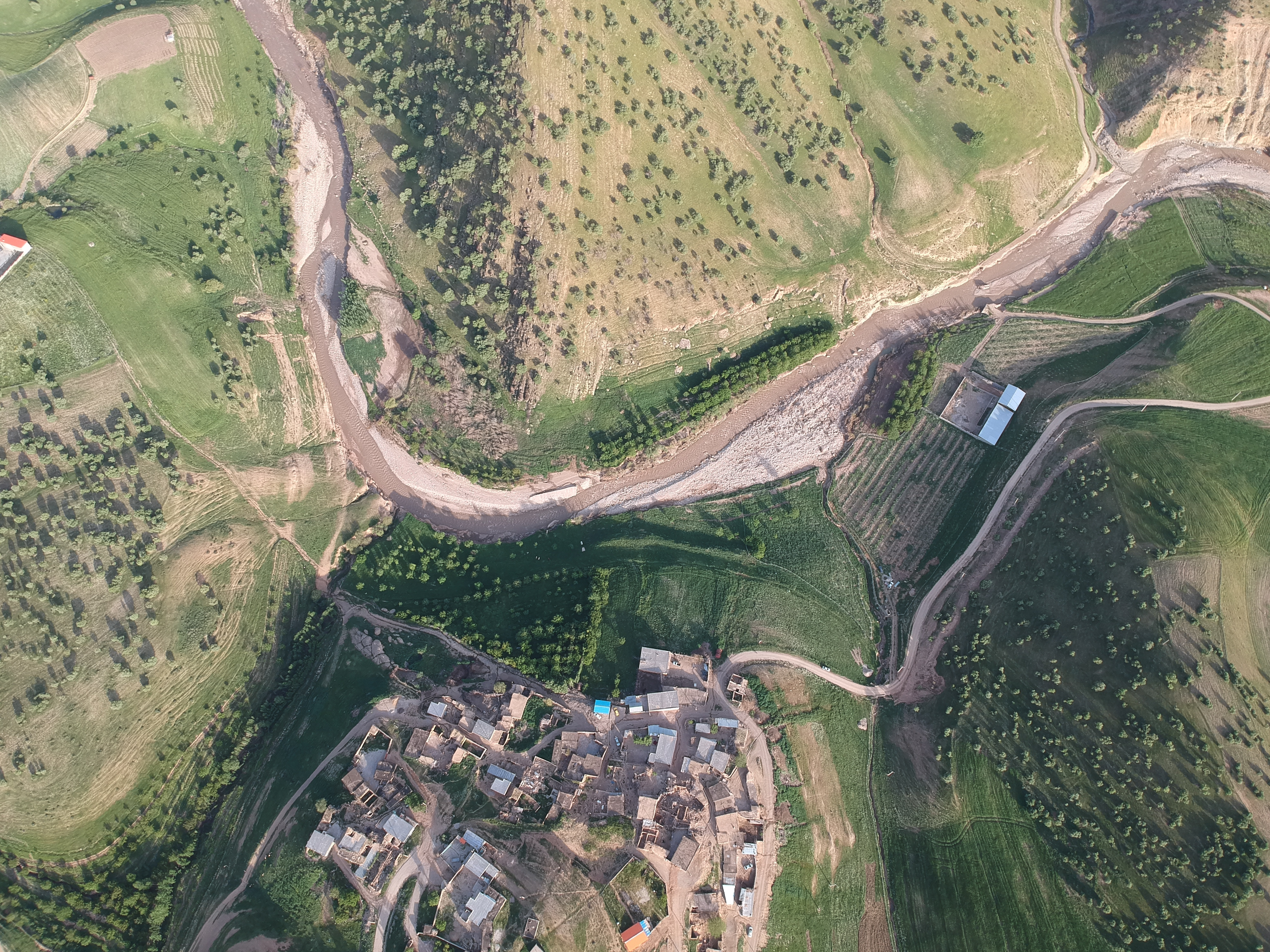
Chenar Khoshkeh

Chenar Khoshkeh (Persian: چنارخشكه, also Romanized as Chenār Khoshkeh) is a village in Kakasharaf Rural District, in the Central District of Khorramabad County, Lorestan Province, Iran. At the 2006 census, its population was 184, in 41 families.
