= Chenaruiyeh, Zarand =

Chenaruiyeh چناروييه
- Village
- Location within Iran
- Coordinates: 30°40′02″N 56°24′18″E
- Country: Iran
- Province: Kerman
- County: Zarand
- Bakhsh: Central
- Rural District: Jorjafak

Population (2006)
  - Total: 13
- Time zone: UTC+3:30 (IRST)
  - Summer (DST): UTC+4:30 (IRDT)

Chenaruiyeh (Persian: چناروييه, also Romanized as Chenārū’īyeh and Chenārūyeh; also known as Chanaroo’eyeh Ya’ghoob) is a village in Jorjafak Rural District, in the Central District of Zarand County, Kerman province, Iran. At the 2006 census, its population was 13, in 5 families.
