= Chenar Kol =

Village in Lorestan, Iran

Chenar Kol چناركل
- Village
- Location within Iran
- Coordinates: 33°19′14″N 48°36′04″E
- Country: Iran
- Province: Lorestan
- County: Khorramabad
- Bakhsh: Central
- Rural District: Kakasharaf

Population (2006)
  - Total: 69
- Time zone: UTC+3:30 (IRST)
  - Summer (DST): UTC+4:30 (IRDT)

Chenar Kol (Persian: چناركل, also Romanized as Chenār Kol and Chenār Gol) is a village in Kakasharaf Rural District, in the Central District of Khorramabad County, Lorestan Province, Iran. At the 2006 census, its population was 69, in 12 families.
