= Çinarlı, Bilasuvar =

Çinarlı
- Municipality
- Location within Azerbaijan
- Coordinates: 39°30′01″N 48°36′09″E
- Country: Azerbaijan
- Rayon: Bilasuvar

Population
  - Total: 693
- Time zone: UTC+4 (AZT)

Çinarlı (also, Cinarlı, known as Novograzhdanovka until 1991) is a village and municipality in the Bilasuvar Rayon of Azerbaijan. It has a population of 693.
