= Chenar-e Allah Qoli =

Village in Ilam, Iran

Chenar-e Allah Qoli چناراله قلي
- Village
- Location within Iran
- Coordinates: 33°42′32″N 47°04′54″E
- Country: Iran
- Province: Ilam
- County: Chardavol
- Bakhsh: Helilan
- Rural District: Helilan

Population (2006)
  - Total: 44
- Time zone: UTC+3:30 (IRST)
  - Summer (DST): UTC+4:30 (IRDT)

Chenar-e Allah Qoli (Persian: چناراله قلي, also Romanized as Chenār-e Allāh Qolī and Chenār Allāh Qolī) is a village in Helilan Rural District, Helilan District, Chardavol County, Ilam Province, Iran. At the 2006 census, its population was 44, in 10 families. The village is populated by Kurds.
