= Char Chinar =

Island in Dal Lake, Srinagar, India

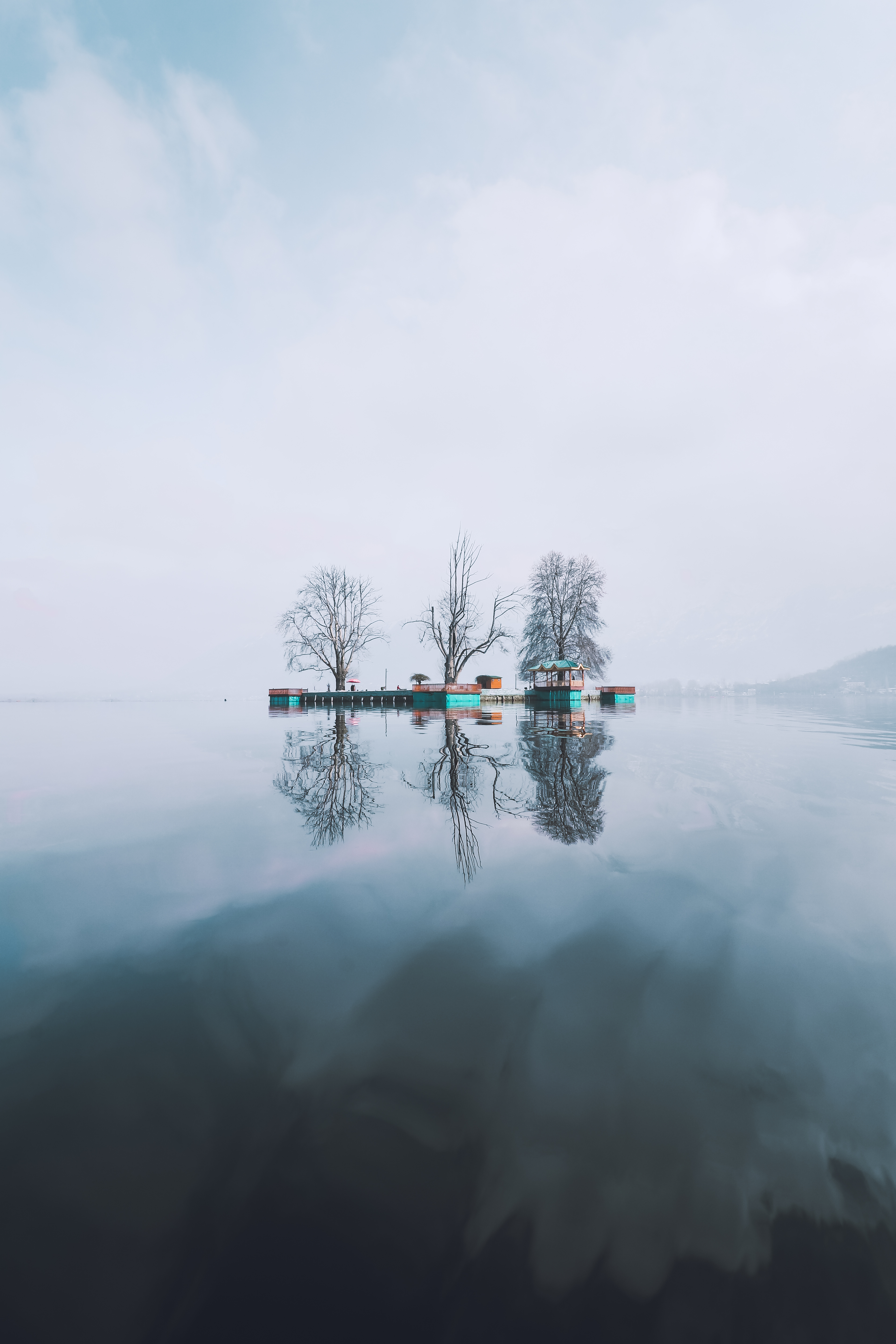

- Location within Jammu and Kashmir Location within India

Geography
- Location: Dal Lake
- Coordinates: 34.1004°N 74.8663°E

Char Chinar, also sometimes called Char Chinari, Ropa Lank, or Rupa Lank, is an island in Dal Lake, Srinagar, Jammu and Kashmir , India. The island located on the Lakut Dal (small Dal) is known as Roph Lank (Silver Island) and is marked with four Chinar trees growing at the corners, thus known as Char Chinari (Four Chinars). A second chinar island, known as Sone Lank (Gold Island), is located on the Bod Dal (Big Dal) and overlooks the shrine of Hazratbal.

== History ==
Murad Baksh, brother of the Mughal emperor Aurangzeb, constructed the Roph Lank.

== Chinar ==
Chinar trees characteristically grow in Western Himalayas. Their botanical name is Platanus orientalis. They have been an important part of Kashmiri tradition, in that, a Chinar tree is found in almost every village in Kashmir. These trees have survived for ages, because Chinar is basically a long-living tree. It spreads wide across a region of cool climate with sufficient water. The tree has several properties - leaves and bark are used as medicine, the wood, known as lace wood, has been used for delicate furniture and the twigs and roots are used for making dyes.

== Decline and restoration ==
Chinar all over Jammu and Kashmir have been affected due to various reasons such as indiscriminate tree felling and floods. Three of the four trees have shown signs of drying up. Some locals blame construction on the island, whereas others blame recent floods and climate change.

The floriculture department of Jammu and Kashmir is making efforts to restore the island and have also planted more Chinar trees on the island.

== Gallery ==
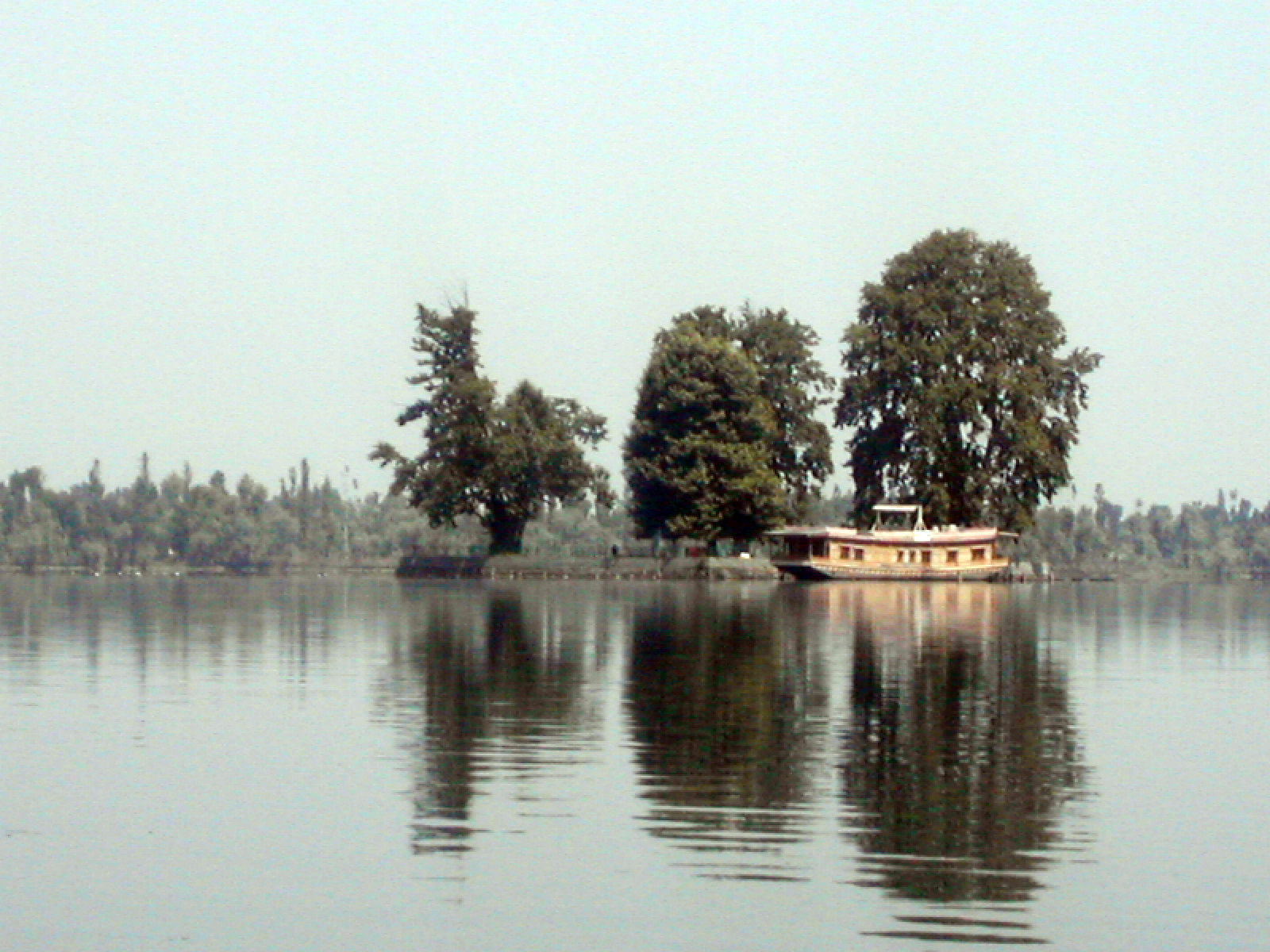

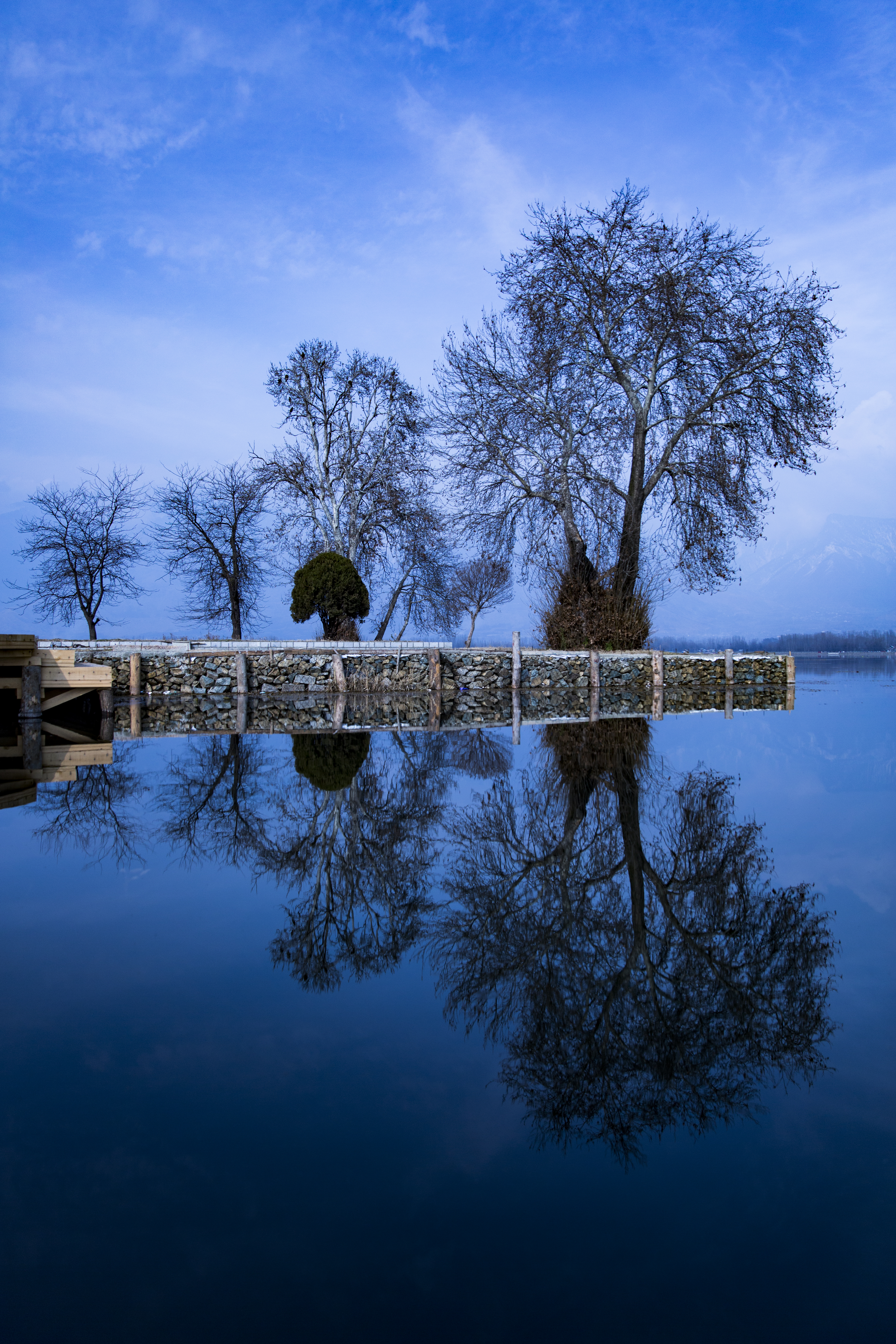

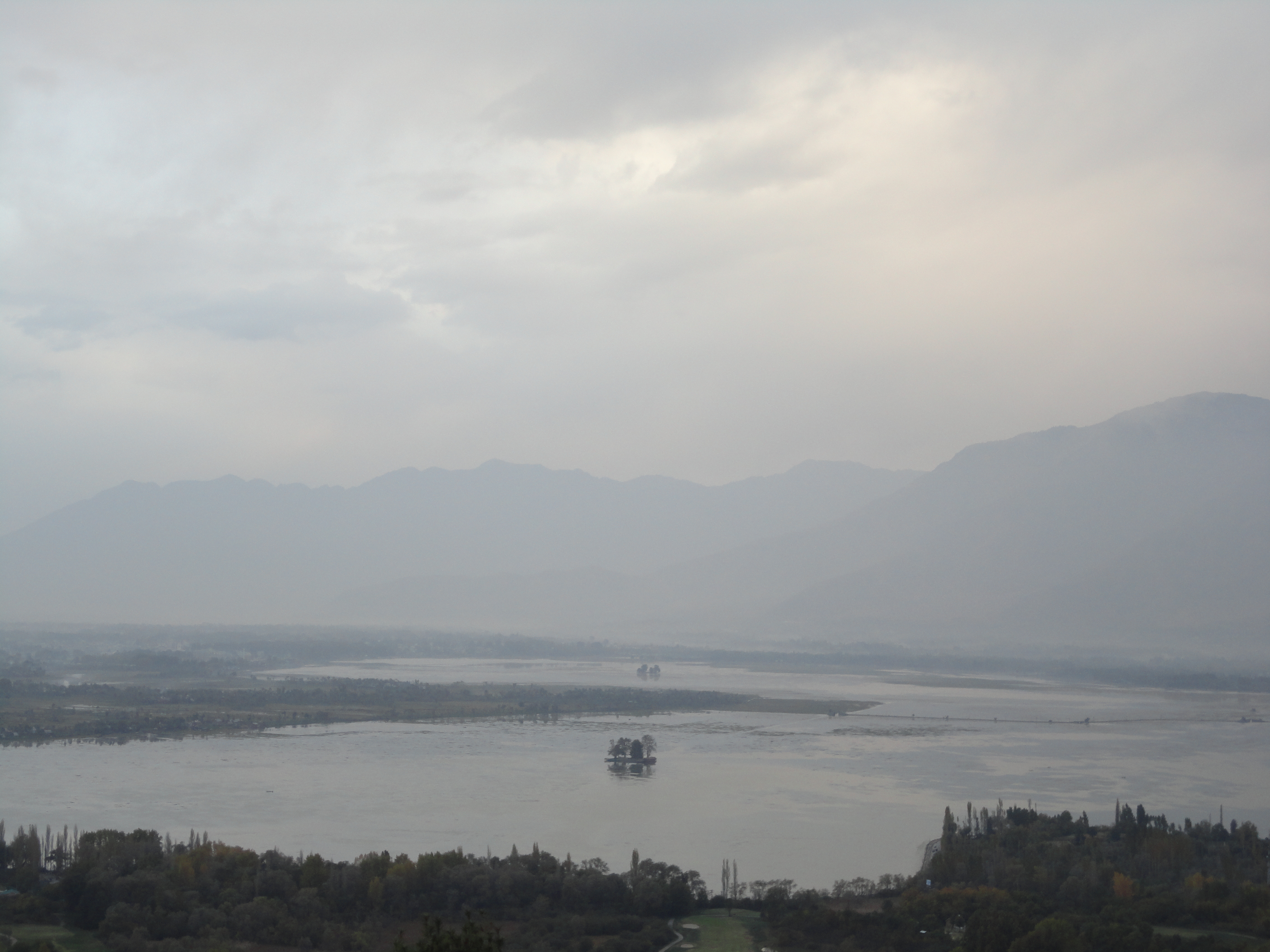

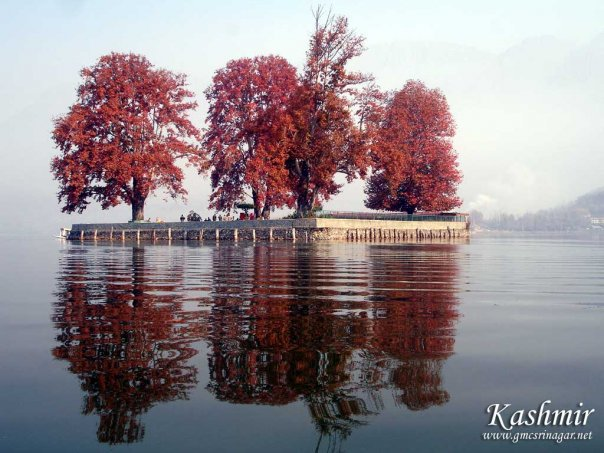

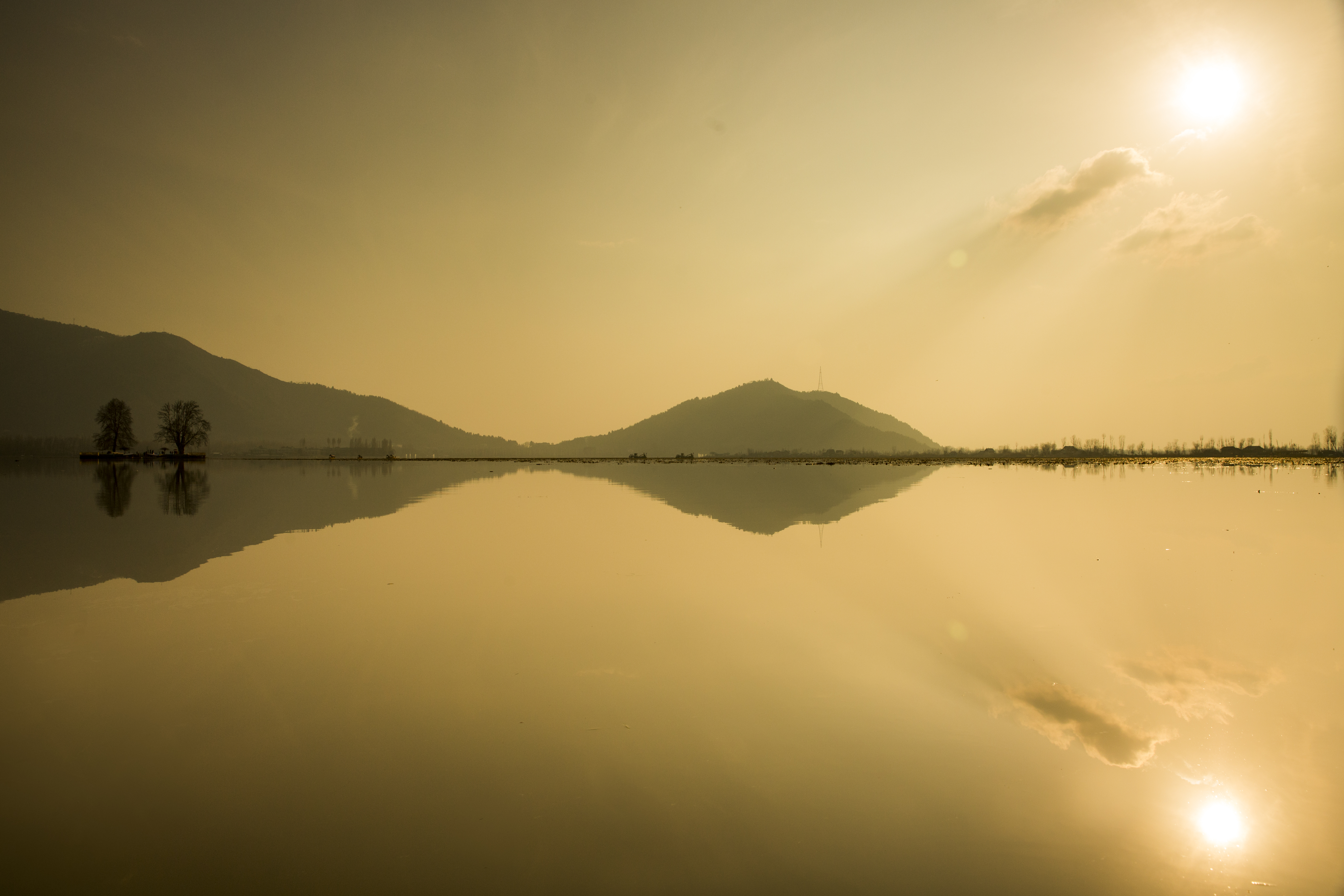

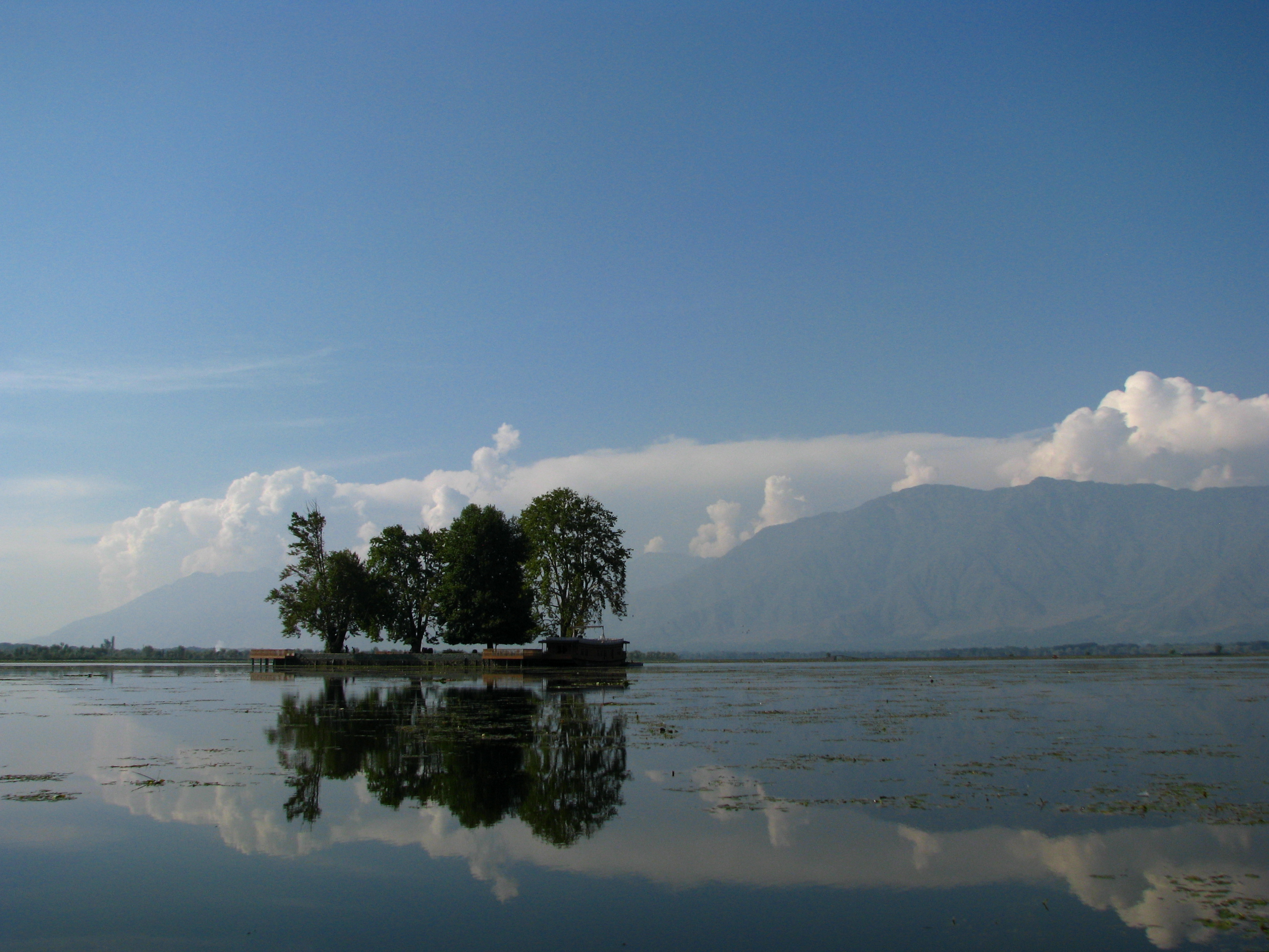
