= Chenareh, Saqqez =

Chenareh چناره
- village
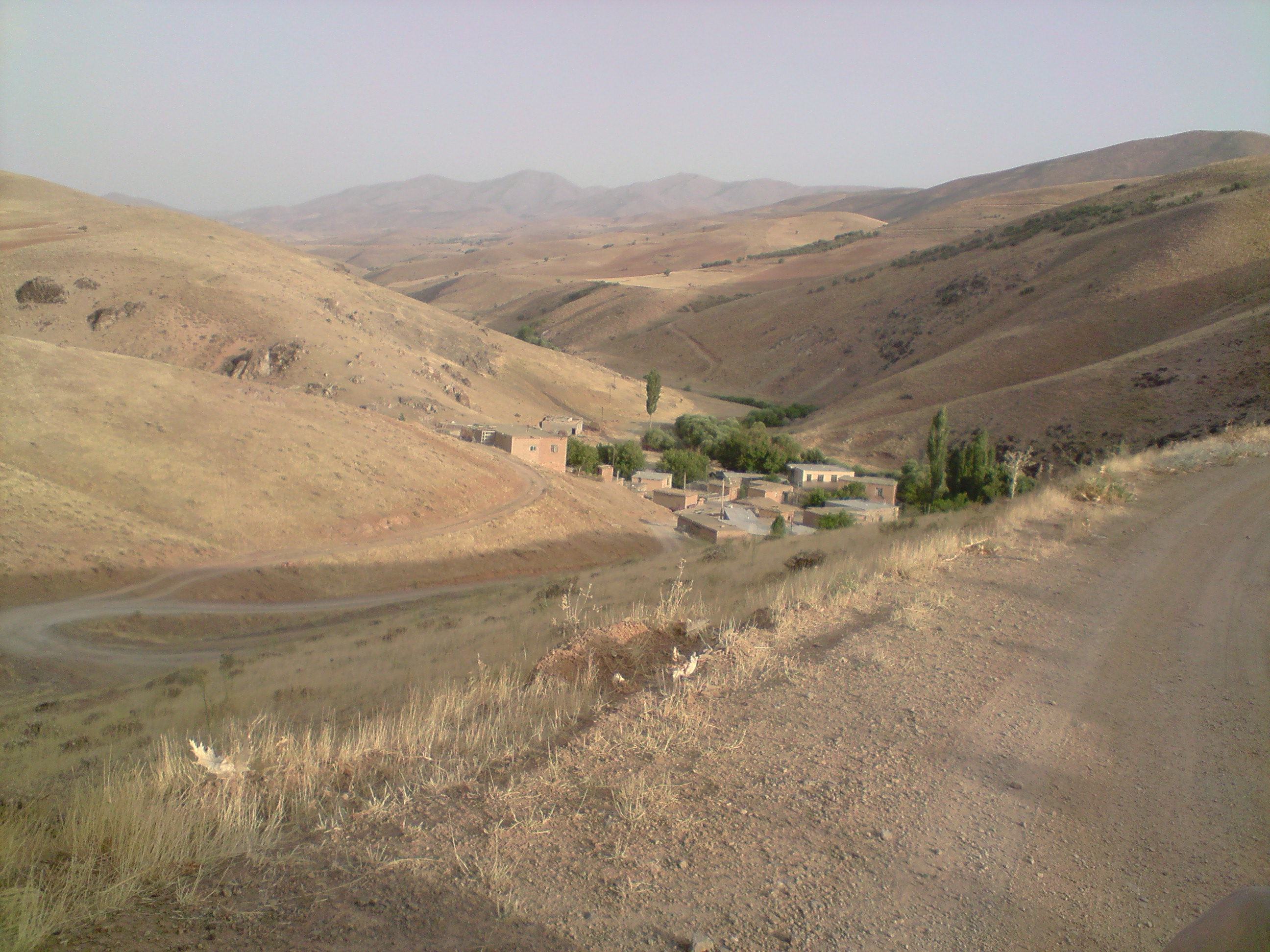

- Location within Iran
- Coordinates: 36°08′39″N 46°34′19″E
- Country: Iran
- Province: Kurdistan
- County: Saqqez
- Bakhsh: Ziviyeh
- Rural District: Emam

Population (2006)
  - Total: 98
- Time zone: UTC+3:30 (IRST)
  - Summer (DST): UTC+4:30 (IRDT)

Chenareh (Persian: چناره, also Romanized as Chenāreh; also known as Chenār) is a village in Emam Rural District, Ziviyeh District, Saqqez County, Kurdistan Province, Iran. At the 2006 census, its population was 98, in 23 families. The village is populated by Kurds.
