= Chenar Bow =

Chenar Bow چناربو
- Village
- Location within Iran
- Coordinates: 35°28′45″N 60°03′44″E
- Country: Iran
- Province: Razavi Khorasan
- County: Fariman
- Bakhsh: Qalandarabad
- Rural District: Qalandarabad

Population (2006)
  - Total: 112
- Time zone: UTC+3:30 (IRST)
  - Summer (DST): UTC+4:30 (IRDT)

Chenar Bow (Persian: چناربو, also Romanized as Chenār Bow; also known as Chenār Bowy and Chehār Bū) is a village in Qalandarabad Rural District, Qalandarabad District, Fariman County, Razavi Khorasan Province, Iran. At the 2006 census, its population was 112, in 24 families.
