= Court of Wards =

Court of Wards may refer to:

- Court of Wards and Liveries, a defunct legal body of 16th- and 17th-century England
- Court of Wards (India), a similar body to the above in India
