= Chenaran, Ravansar =

Chenaran چناران
- Village
- Location within Iran
- Coordinates: 34°41′03″N 46°26′45″E
- Country: Iran
- Province: Kermanshah
- County: Ravansar
- Bakhsh: Central
- Rural District: Dowlatabad

Population (2006)
  - Total: 167
- Time zone: UTC+3:30 (IRST)
  - Summer (DST): UTC+4:30 (IRDT)

Chenaran (Persian: چناران, also Romanized as Chenārān; also known as Konā Garyeh, Konā Gorg (Persian: كناگرگ), and Kona Gorgor) is a village in Dowlatabad Rural District, in the Central District of Ravansar County, Kermanshah Province, Iran. At the 2006 census, its population was 167, in 31 families.
