= Chenaru, Kerman =

Chenaru چنارو
- Village
- Location within Iran
- Coordinates: 30°28′04″N 56°34′15″E
- Country: Iran
- Province: Kerman
- County: Kerman
- Bakhsh: Chatrud
- Rural District: Kavirat

Population (2006)
  - Total: 33
- Time zone: UTC+3:30 (IRST)
  - Summer (DST): UTC+4:30 (IRDT)

Chenaru (Persian: چنارو, also Romanized as Chenārū; also known as Chenārū Abolḩasan) is a village in Kavirat Rural District, Chatrud District, Kerman County, Kerman Province, Iran. At the 2006 census, its population was 33, in 10 families.
