= Chenar Turan =

Chenar Turan چنارتوران
- Village
- Location within Iran
- Coordinates: 29°18′21″N 56°24′36″E
- Country: Iran
- Province: Kerman
- County: Baft
- Bakhsh: Central
- Rural District: Fathabad

Population (2006)
  - Total: 65
- Time zone: UTC+3:30 (IRST)
  - Summer (DST): UTC+4:30 (IRDT)

Chenar Turan (Persian: چنارتوران, also Romanized as Chenār Tūrān) is a village in Fathabad Rural District, in the Central District of Baft County, Kerman Province, Iran. At the 2006 census, its population was 65, in 13 families.
