= Chenaran, Kahnuj =

Chenaran چناران
- Village
- Location within Iran
- Coordinates: 28°05′02″N 57°49′30″E
- Country: Iran
- Province: Kerman
- County: Kahnuj
- Bakhsh: Central
- Rural District: Nakhlestan

Population (2006)
  - Total: 78
- Time zone: UTC+3:30 (IRST)
  - Summer (DST): UTC+4:30 (IRDT)

Chenaran (Persian: چناران, also Romanized as Chenārān) is a village in Nakhlestan Rural District, in the Central District of Kahnuj County, Kerman Province, Iran. At the 2006 census, its population was 78, in 19 families.
