= Dar Chenar, Jiroft =

Dar Chenar درچنار
- Village
- Country: Iran
- Province: Kerman
- County: Jiroft
- Bakhsh: Jebalbarez
- Rural District: Rezvan

Population (2006)
  - Total: 38
- Time zone: UTC+3:30 (IRST)

Dar Chenar (Persian: درچنار, also Romanized as Dar Chenār) is a village in Rezvan Rural District, Jebalbarez District, Jiroft County, Kerman Province, Iran. At the 2006 census, its population was 38, in 9 families.
