= Chenar, Fasa =

Chenar چنار
- Village
- Country: Iran
- Province: Fars
- County: Fasa
- Bakhsh: Central
- Rural District: Sahrarud

Population (2006)
  - Total: 178
- Time zone: UTC+3:30 (IRST)
  - Summer (DST): UTC+4:30 (IRDT)

Chenar (Persian: چنار, also Romanized as Chenār) is a village in Sahrarud Rural District, in the Central District of Fasa County, Fars province, Iran. At the 2006 census, its population was 178, in 37 families.
