= Chenar, Khuzestan =

Chenar چنار
- Village
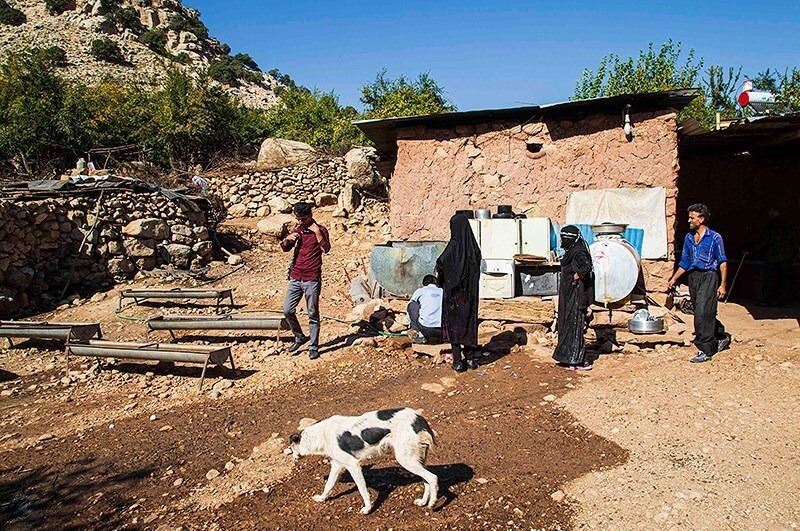
- Chenar

- Location within Iran
- Coordinates: 32°53′48″N 48°15′10″E
- Country: Iran
- Province: Khuzestan
- County: Andimeshk
- Bakhsh: Alvar-e Garmsiri
- Rural District: Qilab

Population (2006)
  - Total: 58
- Time zone: UTC+3:30 (IRST)
  - Summer (DST): UTC+4:30 (IRDT)

Chenar (Persian: چنار, also Romanized as Chenār) is a village in Qilab Rural District, Alvar-e Garmsiri District, Andimeshk County, Khuzestan Province, Iran. At the 2006 census, its population was 58, in 10 families.
