= Chenaranshahr =

City in North Khorasan province, Iran

Chenaranshahr Persian: چناران‌شهر
- City
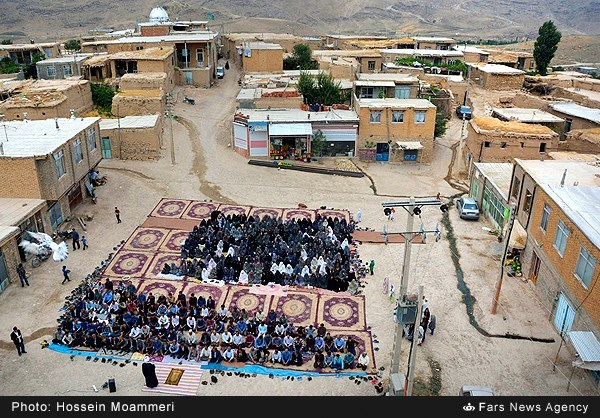
- Chenaranshahr in 2015

- Location within Iran
- Coordinates: 37°23′59″N 57°32′22″E
- Country: Iran
- Province: North Khorasan
- County: Bojnord
- District: Central
- Established as a city: 2013

Population (2016)
  - Total: 3,380
- Time zone: UTC+3:30 (IRST)

Chenaranshahr (Persian: چناران‌شهر) (Note: Formerly Chenaran (چناران‌), also romanized as Chanārān and Chenārān; also known as Shenārān) is a city in the Central District of Bojnord County, North Khorasan province, Iran.

== Demographics ==
=== Population ===
At the time of the 2006 National Census, the population was 3,658 in 856 households, when it was the village of Chenaran in Baba Aman Rural District. The following census in 2011 counted 3,598 people in 1,012 households. The 2016 census measured the population as 3,380 people in 1,015 households, by which time the village had been converted to the city of Chenaranshahr.
