= Çinar, Azerbaijan =

Çinar
- Municipality
- Location within Azerbaijan
- Coordinates: 39°10′09″N 48°20′06″E
- Country: Azerbaijan
- Rayon: Jalilabad

Population
  - Total: 474
- Time zone: UTC+4 (AZT)
  - Summer (DST): UTC+5 (AZT)

Çinar (also, Chinar) is a village and municipality in the Jalilabad Rayon of Azerbaijan. It has a population of 474.
