= Chenaran, Kangavar =

Chenaran چناران
- Village
- Location within Iran
- Coordinates: 34°20′41″N 47°48′08″E
- Country: Iran
- Province: Kermanshah
- County: Kangavar
- Bakhsh: Central
- Rural District: Khezel-e Gharbi

Population (2006)
  - Total: 77
- Time zone: UTC+3:30 (IRST)
  - Summer (DST): UTC+4:30 (IRDT)

Chenaran (Persian: چناران, also Romanized as Chenārān; also known as Chinārān) is a village in Khezel-e Gharbi Rural District, in the Central District of Kangavar County, Kermanshah Province, Iran. At the 2006 census, its population was 77, in 18 families.
