= Chenar, Ardabil =

Chenar
- Location in Iran
- Coordinates: 37°26′48″N 48°21′04″E
- Country: Iran
- Province: Ardabil Province
- Time zone: UTC+3:30 (IRST)
  - Summer (DST): UTC+4:30 (IRDT)

Chenar is a village in the Ardabil Province of Iran.
