= Narlıq =

- Municipality
- Location within Azerbaijan
- Coordinates: 40°03′22″N 48°21′08″E
- Country: Azerbaijan
- Rayon: Sabirabad

Population
  - Total: 1,509
- Time zone: UTC+4 (AZT)
  - Summer (DST): UTC+5 (AZT)

Narlıq (also, Narlyk and Narlykh) is a village and municipality in the Sabirabad Rayon of Azerbaijan. It has a population of 1,509.
