= Chenaran, Kurdistan =

Chenaran چناران
- Village
- Location within Iran
- Coordinates: 35°10′39″N 47°03′34″E
- Country: Iran
- Province: Kurdistan
- County: Sanandaj
- Bakhsh: Central
- Rural District: Naran

Population (2006)
  - Total: 31
- Time zone: UTC+3:30 (IRST)
  - Summer (DST): UTC+4:30 (IRDT)

Chenaran (Persian: چناران, also Romanized as Chenārān; also known as Chinārān) is a village in Naran Rural District, in the Central District of Sanandaj County, Kurdistan Province, Iran. At the 2006 census, its population was 31, in 13 families. The village is populated by Kurds.
