= Chenar Zahedan =

Chenar Zahedan چنارزاهدان
- Village
- Location within Iran
- Coordinates: 30°05′23″N 53°49′51″E
- Country: Iran
- Province: Fars
- County: Bavanat
- Bakhsh: Sarchehan
- Rural District: Sarchehan

Population (2006)
  - Total: 101
- Time zone: UTC+3:30 (IRST)
  - Summer (DST): UTC+4:30 (IRDT)

Chenar Zahedan (Persian: چنارزاهدان, also Romanized as Chenār Zāhedān; also known as Chenār Dozd) is a village in Sarchehan Rural District, Sarchehan District, Bavanat County, Fars province, Iran. At the 2006 census, its population was 101, in 23 families.
