= Narlı, Çatak =

Narlı
- Neighbourhood
- Location in Turkey
- Coordinates: 37°53′00″N 42°58′10″E
- Country: Turkey
- Province: Van
- District: Çatak
- Population (2022): 485
- Time zone: UTC+3 (TRT)

Narlı is a neighbourhood of the municipality and district of Çatak, Van Province, Turkey. Its population is 485 (2022). It is 113 km from Van city and 26 km from Çatak.

== Population ==
Historical population
Year	Pop.	±% p.a.
1997	858	—
2007	665	−2.52%
2012	609	−1.74%
2017	535	−2.56%
2022	485	−1.94%
Source: 1997 census and TÜIK (2007-2022)
