= Chenaruiyeh, Heruz =

Chenaruiyeh چناروئيه
- Village
- Location within Iran
- Coordinates: 30°44′22″N 56°56′20″E
- Country: Iran
- Province: Kerman
- County: Ravar
- Bakhsh: Kuhsaran
- Rural District: Heruz

Population (2006)
  - Total: 93
- Time zone: UTC+3:30 (IRST)
  - Summer (DST): UTC+4:30 (IRDT)

Chenaruiyeh (Persian: چناروئيه, also romanized as Chenārū’īyeh and Chenārūyeh) is a village in Heruz Rural District, Kuhsaran District, Ravar County, Kerman province, Iran. At the 2006 census, its population was 93, in 24 families.
