= Chenar Rudkhan =

Chenar Rudkhan چناررودخان
- Village
- Location within Iran
- Coordinates: 37°03′09″N 49°26′36″E
- Country: Iran
- Province: Gilan
- County: Shaft
- Bakhsh: Ahmadsargurab
- Rural District: Chubar

Population (2006)
  - Total: 481
- Time zone: UTC+3:30 (IRST)
  - Summer (DST): UTC+4:30 (IRDT)

Chenar Rudkhan (Persian: چناررودخان, also Romanized as Chenār Rūdkhān; also known as Chenār, Chēnar, and Chinar) is a village in Chubar Rural District, Ahmadsargurab District, Shaft County, Gilan Province, Iran. At the 2006 census, its population was 481, in 117 families.
