= Erdoğan Çınar =

Turkish writer

- Born: Turkey
- Occupation: Writer
- Writing career
- Genre: Non-fiction
- Subjects: Religion and history
- Notable work: Aleviliğin Gizli Tarihi (2004)
- Literary movement: Ishikism

Erdoğan Çınar is a Turkish writer known for promoting Ishikism. He has written extensively on Alevism, Bektashism, the history of religion, Turkish history and archaeology, and many other topics. Although proponents of Ishikism heavily depend on Erdoğan Çınar's works, others have criticized his works as historical revisionism or pseudohistory.

== Views on Alevism ==
In 2004, Erdoğan Çınar published his seminal book Aleviliğin Gizli Tarihi ("The Secret History of Alevism"), which claimed that Alevism is the oldest religion in the world. As the "First and True Religion" of the world, Çınar claims that Alevism is the main source of all other religions and beliefs in the world:

Aleviliğin, on binlerce yıllık geçmişten gelen, bütün inanışları etkilemiş, semavi dinlere başlangıç oluşturmuş asıl kaynak, "Serçeşme", olduğunu bütün gerçekliğiyle ortaya çıkartıyor.

It has now been brought into the open with all its truth, that Alevism, with its tens of thousands of years of history, has influenced all beliefs and has been the Original Source (the so-called "Serçeşme" – meaning "Beginning Spot of Fountain") of the celestial religions.

— Erdoğan Çınar in: Aleviliğin Gizli Tarihi (2004)

Çınar claims that the Luwians, Paulicians, Bogomils, Cathars, and other Gnostic groups were in fact Alevis. He identifies the legendary Alevi figure Pir Sultan Abdal as Constantine-Silvanus, the founder of Paulicianism. Thus, according to Çınar, the Paulicians and other Gnostic groups of the Byzantine Empire were not actually Christians, but were in fact "Alevis" in the original sense. His 2007 book Aleviliğin Kayıp Bin Yılı (325-1325) discusses the "lost millennium" of Alevi history during the Byzantine Empire (325-1325 CE).

In the 2020 book Bronz Çağı’nda Alevilik, Erdoğan Çınar identifies some Anatolian Bronze Age civilizations (4000 BC-1750 BC) with Alevism.

== Reception ==
Erdoğan Çınar's works and ideas have received mixed reception. Writers such as Haşim Kutlu strongly supported his ideas. Some Alevis were highly receptive towards his ideas, while others distanced themselves from them. Hamza Aksüt, an Alevi historian, criticized his ideas as pseudohistory. Another writer, Ünsal Öztürk, has also criticized Erdoğan Çınar. In 2010, Hamza Aksüt, Hasan Harmancı, and Ünsal Öztürk published the book Alevi Tarih Yazımında Skandal – Erdoğan Çınar Örneği (A Scandal in Alevi History Writing – The Erdoğan Çınar Example), which criticizes Erdoğan Çınar's ideas as historical revisionism.

== Books ==
Books by Erdoğan Çınar:

- Çınar, Erdoğan (2004). Aleviliğin Gizli Tarihi: Demirin Üstünde Karınca İzi. ISBN 9789758663798. ("The Secret History of Alevism")
- Çınar, Erdoğan (2007). Kayıp Bir Alevi Efsanesi. ISBN 9786055679088. ("The Lost Alevi Legend")
- Çınar, Erdoğan (2007). Aleviliğin Kayıp Bin Yılı (325-1325). ISBN 9786054511600. ("The Lost Millennium of Alevism: 325-1325")
- Çınar, Erdoğan (2008). Aleviliğin Kökleri: Abdal Musa'nın Sırrı. ISBN 9786055679095. ("The Roots of Alevism: The Esotericism of Abdal Musa")
- Çınar, Erdoğan (2009). Bahçe Bizim Gül Bizdedir. ISBN 9786055679118. ("We Have a Rose in the Garden")
- Çınar, Erdoğan (2012). Dergah'ın Sırrı: Aleviliğin Kayıp Hafızası. ISBN 9786054511594. ("The Secret of Dergah: The Lost Story of Alevism")
- Çınar, Erdoğan (2020). Bronz Çağı’nda Alevilik (M.Ö.4000-M.Ö.1750): Aleviliğin Kayıp Hafızası, İkinci Kitap. ISBN 9786057942180. ("Alevism in the Bronze Age (4000 BC-1750 BC): The Lost Story of Alevism, Second Book")
