= Chenar Bagali =

Chenar Bagali چناربگالي
- Village
- Location within Iran
- Coordinates: 33°20′32″N 48°15′40″E
- Country: Iran
- Province: Lorestan
- County: Khorramabad
- Bakhsh: Central
- Rural District: Koregah-e Gharbi

Population (2006)
  - Total: 222
- Time zone: UTC+3:30 (IRST)
  - Summer (DST): UTC+4:30 (IRDT)

Chenar Bagali (Persian: چناربگالي, also Romanized as Chenār Bagālī, Chenār Bāghaleh, Chenār Bāgheleh, Chenār Begālī, and Chinār Bāghle; also known as Robāghaleh) is a village in Koregah-e Gharbi Rural District, in the Central District of Khorramabad County, Lorestan Province, Iran. At the 2006 census, its population was 222, in 50 families.
