= Chenar-e Olya, Kermanshah =

Village in Kermanshah, Iran

Chenar-e Olya چنارعليا
- Village
- Location within Iran
- Coordinates: 33°55′49″N 47°07′31″E
- Country: Iran
- Province: Kermanshah
- County: Kermanshah
- Bakhsh: Firuzabad
- Rural District: Jalalvand

Population (2006)
  - Total: 59
- Time zone: UTC+3:30 (IRST)
  - Summer (DST): UTC+4:30 (IRDT)

Chenar-e Olya (Persian: چنارعليا, also Romanized as Chenār-e 'Olyā) is a village in Jalalvand Rural District, Firuzabad District, Kermanshah County, Kermanshah province, Iran. At the 2006 census, its population was 59, in 11 families.
