= Chenaru, Fars =

Chenaru چنارو
- Village
- Location within Iran
- Coordinates: 29°04′58″N 54°33′35″E
- Country: Iran
- Province: Fars
- County: Neyriz
- Bakhsh: Central
- Rural District: Horgan

Population (2006)
  - Total: 40
- Time zone: UTC+3:30 (IRST)
  - Summer (DST): UTC+4:30 (IRDT)

Chenaru (Persian: چنارو, also Romanized as Chenārū and Chenaroo; also known as Chenārūyeh) is a village in Horgan Rural District, in the Central District of Neyriz County, Fars province, Iran. At the 2006 census, its population was 40, in 13 families.
