= Chenar-e Sofla, Sahneh =

Village in Kermanshah, Iran

Chenar-e Sofla چنارسفلي
- Village
- Location within Iran
- Coordinates: 34°23′13″N 47°45′46″E
- Country: Iran
- Province: Kermanshah
- County: Sahneh
- Bakhsh: Central
- Rural District: Sahneh

Population (2006)
  - Total: 37
- Time zone: UTC+3:30 (IRST)
  - Summer (DST): UTC+4:30 (IRDT)

Chenar-e Sofla (Persian: چنارسفلي, also Romanized as Chenār-e Shoveh) is a village in Sahneh Rural District, in the Central District of Sahneh County, Kermanshah Province, Iran. At the 2006 census, its population was 37, in 9 families.
