= Bagh Chenar, Chaharmahal and Bakhtiari =

Bagh Chenar باغ چنار
- Village
- Location within Iran
- Coordinates: 32°14′53″N 49°59′12″E
- Country: Iran
- Province: Chaharmahal and Bakhtiari
- County: Kuhrang
- Bakhsh: Bazoft
- Rural District: Bazoft

Population (2006)
  - Total: 349
- Time zone: UTC+3:30 (IRST)
  - Summer (DST): UTC+4:30 (IRDT)

Bagh Chenar (Persian: باغ چنار, also Romanized as Bāgh Chenār; also known as Chenār) is a village in Bazoft Rural District, Bazoft District, Kuhrang County, Chaharmahal and Bakhtiari Province, Iran. At the 2006 census, its population was 349 with 54 total families. The village is populated by Lurs.
