= Chenar, Kerman =

Chenar چنار
- Village
- Location within Iran
- Coordinates: 30°11′51″N 55°26′56″E
- Country: Iran
- Province: Kerman
- County: Shahr-e Babak
- Bakhsh: Central
- Rural District: Meymand

Population (2006)
  - Total: 110
- Time zone: UTC+3:30 (IRST)
  - Summer (DST): UTC+4:30 (IRDT)

Chenar (Persian: چنار, also Romanized as Chenār; also known as Chenaroo’eyeh and Chinār) is a village in Meymand Rural District, in the Central District of Shahr-e Babak County, Kerman province, Iran. At the 2006 census, its population was 110, in 34 families.
