= Shahi Jan =

Shahi Jan شاهيجان
- Village
- Location within Iran
- Coordinates: 30°03′37″N 52°32′07″E
- Country: Iran
- Province: Fars
- County: Marvdasht
- Bakhsh: Dorudzan
- Rural District: Ramjerd-e Do

Population (2006)
  - Total: 374
- Time zone: UTC+3:30 (IRST)
  - Summer (DST): UTC+4:30 (IRDT)

Shahi Jan (Persian: شاهيجان, also Romanized as Shāhī Jān; also known as Chenār-e Shāhī Jān and Chenar Shahijan) is a village in Ramjerd-e Do Rural District, Dorudzan District, Marvdasht County, Fars province, Iran. At the 2006 census, its population was 374, in 80 families.
