= Chenar-e Modvi-e Bala =

Chenar-e Modvi-e Bala چنارمدوي بالا
- Village
- Location within Iran
- Coordinates: 33°54′19″N 47°34′20″E
- Country: Iran
- Province: Lorestan
- County: Kuhdasht
- Bakhsh: Central
- Rural District: Kuhdasht-e Shomali

Population (2006)
  - Total: 164
- Time zone: UTC+3:30 (IRST)
  - Summer (DST): UTC+4:30 (IRDT)

Chenar-e Modvi-e Bala (Persian: چنارمدوي بالا, also Romanized as Chenār-e Modvī-e Bālā; also known as Chenār-e Modvī) is a village in Kuhdasht-e Shomali Rural District, in the Central District of Kuhdasht County, Lorestan Province, Iran. At the 2006 census, its population was 164, in 32 families.
