= Chenar-e Sofla, Qazvin =

Chenar-e Sofla چنارسفلي
- Village
- Location within Iran
- Coordinates: 35°40′04″N 49°44′07″E
- Country: Iran
- Province: Qazvin
- County: Buin Zahra
- Bakhsh: Central
- Rural District: Sagezabad

Population (2006)
  - Total: 122
- Time zone: UTC+3:30 (IRST)
  - Summer (DST): UTC+4:30 (IRDT)

Chenar-e Sofla (Persian: چنارسفلي, Azerbaijani: Aşağı Çinar, also Romanized as Chenār-e Soflá and Chenār Soflá; also known as Chenār-e Pā’īn) is a village in Sagezabad Rural District, in the Central District of Buin Zahra County, Qazvin Province, Iran. At the 2006 census, its population was 122, in 32 families. This village is populated by Azerbaijani Turks.
