= Chenaruiyeh, Fars =

Chenaruiyeh چناروئيه
- Village
- Location within Iran
- Coordinates: 29°54′55″N 53°54′57″E
- Country: Iran
- Province: Fars
- County: Bavanat
- Bakhsh: Sarchehan
- Rural District: Tujerdi

Population (2006)
  - Total: 650
- Time zone: UTC+3:30 (IRST)
  - Summer (DST): UTC+4:30 (IRDT)

Chenaruiyeh (Persian: چناروئيه, also Romanized as Chenārū’īyeh, Chenārrū’īyeh, and Chenārūyeh; also known as Chenar) is a village in Tujerdi Rural District, Sarchehan District, Bavanat County, Fars province, Iran. At the 2006 census, its population was 650, in 145 families.
