= Valiabad =

Valiabad or Waliabad (Persian: ولی‌آباد) may refer to:

== Ardabil Province ==
- Valiabad, Ardabil, a village in Meshgin Shahr County

== Fars Province ==
- Valiabad, Arsanjan, a village in Arsanjan County
- Valiabad, Fasa, a village in Fasa County
- Valiabad, Kazerun, a village in Kazerun County

== Hamadan Province ==
- Valiabad, Hamadan, a village in Asadabad County

== Kerman Province ==
- Valiabad, Arzuiyeh, a village in Arzuiyeh County
- Valiabad, Bardsir, a village in Bardsir County
- Valiabad, Fahraj, a village in Fahraj County
- Valiabad, Shahdad, a village in Kerman County
- Valiabad, Rafsanjan, a village in Rafsanjan County

== Kermanshah Province ==
- Valiabad, Kermanshah, a village in Kermanshah County
- Valiabad, Ravansar, a village in Ravansar County

== Khuzestan Province ==
- Valiabad, Behbahan, a village in Behbahan County
- Valiabad, Lali, a village in Lali County
- Valiabad, Shushtar, a village in Shushtar County

== Kohgiluyeh and Boyer-Ahmad Province ==
- Valiabad-e Deli Khomsir, a village in Dana County

== Kurdistan Province ==
- Valiabad, Baneh, a village in Baneh County
- Valiabad, Qorveh, a village in Qorveh County

== Lorestan Province ==
- Valiabad, Lorestan
- Valiabad Khosrow Khani, Lorestan
- Valiabad-e Cham Puneh, Lorestan
- Valiabad-e Shiri, Lorestan

== Mazandaran Province ==
- Valiabad, Chalus, a village in Chalus County
- Valiabad, Sari, a village in Sari County
- Valiabad, Tonekabon, a village in Tonekabon County

== North Khorasan Province ==
- Valiabad, Esfarayen, a village in Esfarayen County, North Khorasan Province, Iran
- Valiabad, Faruj, a village in Faruj County, North Khorasan Province, Iran

== Qazvin Province ==
- Valiabad, Zahray-ye Bala, Qazvin

== Razavi Khorasan Province ==
- Valiabad, Razavi Khorasan

== Sistan and Baluchestan Province ==
- Valiabad, Iranshahr, a village in Iranshahr County

== South Khorasan Province ==
- Valiabad, South Khorasan, a village in Zirkuh County

== Tehran Province ==
- Valiabad, Tehran
- Valiabad, Qarchak, a village in Qarchak County
- Valiabad, Rey, a village in Rey County
- Valiabad-e Jazairi, Tehran
- Valiabad Rural District, in Qarchak County

== West Azerbaijan Province ==
- Valiabad, West Azerbaijan, a village in Miandoab County
