= Morad Ali =

Morad Ali (Persian: مراد علي) may refer to:

- Balutban
- Meleh-ye Balut
- Morad Ali, Lorestan
- Morad Ali, Hirmand, Sistan and Baluchestan Province
- Morad Ali-ye Olya, West Azerbaijan Province
- Morad Ali-ye Sofla, West Azerbaijan Province
