= Gandabeh =

Gandabeh (Persian: گندابه) may refer to:

- Gandabeh, Dowreh
- Gandabeh, Khorramabad

- Gandabeh, Azna
- Gandabeh, Robat
