= Benarkabud =

Benarkabud or Benar Kabud (Persian: بناركبود) may refer to:

- Benar Kabud, Khorramabad
- Benarkabud-e Do, Dowreh County
- Benarkabud-e Seh, Dowreh County
- Benarkabud-e Yek, Dowreh County
