= Dul Gavmishan =

Village in Lorestan province, Iran

Dul Gavmishan Persian: دول گاو ميشان
- Village
- Location within Iran
- Country: Iran
- Province: Lorestan
- County: Chegeni
- District: Shahivand
- Rural District: Kashkan-e Jonubi

Population (2016)
  - Total: 114
- Time zone: UTC+3:30 (IRST)

Dul Gavmishan (Persian: دول گاو ميشان) (Note: Also romanized as Dūl Gāvmīshān; formerly known as Kaleh Ban 1 (كله بان 1), also romanized as Kaleh Bān 1) is a village in Kashkan-e Jonubi Rural District of Shahivand District in Chegeni County, (Note: Formerly Dowreh County) Lorestan province, Iran.

== Demographics ==
=== Population ===
At the time of the 2006 National Census, the village's population, as Kaleh Ban 1, was 138 in 27 households, when it was in Teshkan Rural District of the former Dowreh-ye Chegeni District in Khorramabad County. The following census in 2011 counted 177 people in 46 households, by which time the district had been separated from the county in the establishment of Dowreh County. (Note: Renamed Chegeni County) The rural district was transferred to the new Chegeni District, (Note: Renamed the Central District) and the village, listed as Dul Gavmishan, was transferred to Kashkan-e Jonubi Rural District created in the new Shahivand District. The 2016 census measured the population of the village as 114 people in 29 households.
