= Charkhestaneh =

Charkhestaneh (Persian: چرخستانه) may refer to:

- Charkhestaneh, Azna, Iran
- Charkhestaneh, Dowreh, Iran
- Charkhestaneh, Khorramabad, Iran
