= Shahbaz Bek =

Village in Lorestan province, Iran

Shahbaz Bek Persian: شهبازبك
- Village
- Location within Iran
- Coordinates: 33°34′24″N 47°48′43″E
- Country: Iran
- Province: Lorestan
- County: Chegeni
- District: Shahivand
- Rural District: Kashkan-e Jonubi

Population (2016)
  - Total: 229
- Time zone: UTC+3:30 (IRST)

Shahbaz Bek (Persian: شهبازبك) (Note: Also romanized as Shahbāz Bek; also known as Shahbāz Beg, and Shahbāz Beyg) is a village in Kashkan-e Jonubi Rural District of Shahivand District in Chegeni County, (Note: Formerly Dowreh County) Lorestan province, Iran.

== Demographics ==
=== Population ===
At the time of the 2006 National Census, the village's population was 284 in 59 households, when it was in Teshkan Rural District of the former Dowreh-ye Chegeni District in Khorramabad County. The following census in 2011 counted 236 people in 54 households, by which time the district had been separated from the county in the establishment of Dowreh County. (Note: Renamed Chegeni County) The rural district was transferred to the new Chegeni District, (Note: Renamed the Central District) and the village was transferred to Kashkan-e Jonubi Rural District created in the new Shahivand District. The 2016 census measured the population of the village as 229 people in 61 households.
