= Chenar-e Pain, Chegeni =

Village in Lorestan province, Iran

Chenar-e Pain Persian: چنار پايي
- Village
- Location within Iran
- Country: Iran
- Province: Lorestan
- County: Chegeni
- District: Shahivand
- Rural District: Kashkan-e Jonubi

Population (2016)
  - Total: 14
- Time zone: UTC+3:30 (IRST)

Chenar-e Pain (Persian: چنار پايي) (Note: Also romanized as Chenār-e Pā’īn; formerly known as Chenar-e Sofla (چنار سفلي), also romanized as Chenār-e Soflá; also known as Bābājānī (باباجاني)) is a village in Kashkan-e Jonubi Rural District of Shahivand District in Chegeni County, (Note: Formerly Dowreh County) Lorestan province, Iran.

== Demographics ==
=== Population ===
At the time of the 2006 National Census, the village's population, as Chenar-e Sofla, was 29 in six households, when it was in Teshkan Rural District of the former Dowreh-ye Chegeni District in Khorramabad County. The following census in 2011 counted a population below the reporting threshold, by which time the district had been separated from the county in the establishment of Dowreh County. (Note: Renamed Chegeni County) The rural district was transferred to the new Chegeni District, (Note: Renamed the Central District) and the village, listed as Chenar-e Pain, was transferred to Kashkan-e Jonubi Rural District created in the new Shahivand District. The 2016 census measured the population of the village as 14 people in four households.
