= Yar-e Hoseyn =

Village in Lorestan province, Iran

Yar-e Hoseyn Persian: يارحسين
- Village
- Location within Iran
- Coordinates: 33°33′34″N 47°49′18″E
- Country: Iran
- Province: Lorestan
- County: Chegeni
- District: Shahivand
- Rural District: Kashkan-e Jonubi

Population (2016)
  - Total: 56
- Time zone: UTC+3:30 (IRST)

Yar-e Hoseyn (Persian: يارحسين) (Note: Also romanized as Yār-e Ḩoseyn) is a village in Kashkan-e Jonubi Rural District of Shahivand District in Chegeni County, (Note: Formerly Dowreh County) Lorestan province, Iran.

== Demographics ==
=== Population ===
At the time of the 2006 National Census, the village's population was 69 in 16 households, when it was in Teshkan Rural District of the former Dowreh-ye Chegeni District in Khorramabad County. The following census in 2011 counted 56 people in 13 households, by which time the district had been separated from the county in the establishment of Dowreh County. (Note: Renamed Chegeni County) The rural district was transferred to the new Chegeni District, (Note: Renamed the Central District) and the village was transferred to Kashkan-e Jonubi Rural District created in the new Shahivand District. The 2016 census measured the population of the village as 56 people in 16 households.
