= Kaleh Ban =

Village in Lorestan province, Iran

Kaleh Ban Persian: کله بان
- Village
- Location within Iran
- Coordinates: 33°34′29″N 47°48′05″E
- Country: Iran
- Province: Lorestan
- County: Chegeni
- District: Shahivand
- Rural District: Kashkan-e Jonubi

Population (2016)
  - Total: 154
- Time zone: UTC+3:30 (IRST)

Kaleh Ban (Persian: کله بان) (Note: Also romanized as Kaleh Bān; also known as Kaleh Bān 2) is a village in Kashkan-e Jonubi Rural District of Shahivand District in Chegeni County, (Note: Formerly Dowreh County) Lorestan province, Iran.

== Demographics ==
=== Population ===
At the time of the 2006 National Census, the village's population was 278 in 57 households, when it was in Teshkan Rural District of the former Dowreh-ye Chegeni District in Khorramabad County. The following census in 2011 counted 249 people in 59 households, by which time the district had been separated from the county in the establishment of Dowreh County. (Note: Renamed Chegeni County) The rural district was transferred to the new Chegeni District, (Note: Renamed the Central District) and the village was transferred to Kashkan-e Jonubi Rural District created in the new Shahivand District. The 2016 census measured the population of the village as 154 people in 41 households.
