= Chenar-e Bala, Chegeni =

Village in Lorestan province, Iran

Chenar-e Bala Persian: چنار بالا
- Village
- Location within Iran
- Coordinates: 33°31′17″N 47°47′45″E
- Country: Iran
- Province: Lorestan
- County: Chegeni
- District: Shahivand
- Rural District: Kashkan-e Jonubi

Population (2016)
  - Total: 46
- Time zone: UTC+3:30 (IRST)

Chenar-e Bala (Persian: چنار بالا) (Note: Also romanized as Chenār-e Bālā; formerly known as Chenar-e Kaliab (چنارکالياب), also romanized as Chenār-e Kālīāb; also known as Chenār-e 'Olyā (چنار عليا)) is a village in Kashkan-e Jonubi Rural District of Shahivand District in Chegeni County, (Note: Formerly Dowreh County) Lorestan province, Iran.

== Demographics ==
=== Population ===
At the time of the 2006 National Census, the village's population, as Chenar-e Kaliab, was 108 in 24 households, when it was in Teshkan Rural District of the former Dowreh-ye Chegeni District in Khorramabad County. The following census in 2011 counted 226 people in 55 households, by which time the district had been separated from the county in the establishment of Dowreh County. (Note: Renamed Chegeni County) The rural district was transferred to the new Chegeni District, (Note: Renamed the Central District) and the village, listed as Chenar-e Bala, was transferred to Kashkan-e Jonubi Rural District created in the new Shahivand District. The 2016 census measured the population of the village as 46 people in 14 households.
