= Tulabi, Lorestan =

Village in Lorestan province, Iran

Tulabi Persian: طولابي
- Village
- Location within Iran
- Coordinates: 33°36′13″N 47°54′30″E
- Country: Iran
- Province: Lorestan
- County: Chegeni
- District: Central
- Rural District: Teshkan

Population (2016)
  - Total: 285
- Time zone: UTC+3:30 (IRST)

Tulabi (Persian: طولابي) (Note: Also romanized as Tūlābī; formerly known as Tulabi Baraftab (طولابي برآفتاب), also romanized as Tūlābī Barāftāb; also known as Dom Dūsh-e Barāftāb and Dūsh-e Barāftāb (دوش برآفتاب)) is a village in Teshkan Rural District of the Central District (Note: Formerly Chegeni District) in Chegeni County, (Note: Formerly Dowreh County) Lorestan province, Iran.

== Demographics ==
=== Population ===
At the time of the 2006 National Census, the village's population, as Tulabi Baraftab, was 338 in 64 households, when it was in the former Dowreh-ye Chegeni District of Khorramabad County. The following census in 2011 counted 283 people in 72 households, by which time the district had been separated from the county in the establishment of Dowreh County. (Note: Renamed Chegeni County) The rural district was transferred to the new Chegeni District, (Note: Renamed the Central District) and the village was listed as Tulabi. The 2016 census measured the population of the village as 285 people in 77 households.
