= Chenar-e Mishakhvor =

Village in Lorestan province, Iran

Chenar-e Mishakhvor Persian: چنارميشاخور
- Village
- Location within Iran
- Coordinates: 33°36′25″N 47°57′11″E
- Country: Iran
- Province: Lorestan
- County: Chegeni
- District: Central
- Rural District: Dowreh

Population (2016)
  - Total: 131
- Time zone: UTC+3:30 (IRST)

Chenar-e Mishakhvor (Persian: چنارميشاخور) (Note: Also romanized as Chenār-e Mīshākhor and Chenār-e Mīshākhvor; also known as Mīshākhor) is a village in Dowreh Rural District of the Central District (Note: Formerly Chegeni District) in Chegeni County, (Note: Formerly Dowreh County) Lorestan province, Iran.

== Demographics ==
=== Population ===
At the time of the 2006 National Census, the village's population was 169 in 40 households, when it was in the former Dowreh-ye Chegeni District of Khorramabad County. The following census in 2011 counted 137 people in 38 households, by which time the district had been separated from the county in the establishment of Dowreh County. (Note: Renamed Chegeni County) The rural district was transferred to the new Chegeni District. (Note: Renamed the Central District) The 2016 census measured the population of the village as 131 people in 35 households.
