= Sarab, Lorestan =

Village in Lorestan province, Iran

Sarab Persian: سراب
- Village
- Location within Iran
- Coordinates: 33°41′04″N 47°53′17″E
- Country: Iran
- Province: Lorestan
- County: Chegeni
- District: Central
- Rural District: Teshkan

Population (2016)
  - Total: 461
- Time zone: UTC+3:30 (IRST)

Sarab (Persian: سراب) (Note: Also romanized as Sarāb; formerly known as Sarab-e Rofteh Khan (سرابرفتخان), also romanized as Sarāb-e Rofteh Khān; also known as Sarāb-e Rafkhān, Sarāb-e Raft Khān, Sarāb-e Roftkhān, and Sarab-i-Rafkhan) is a village in Teshkan Rural District of the Central District (Note: Formerly Chegeni District) in Chegeni County, (Note: Formerly Dowreh County) Lorestan province, Iran.

== Demographics ==
=== Population ===
At the time of the 2006 National Census, the village's population, as Sarab-e Rofteh Khan, was 466 in 98 households, when it was in the former Dowreh-ye Chegeni District of Khorramabad County. The following census in 2011 counted 465 people in 119 households, by which time the district had been separated from the county in the establishment of Dowreh County. (Note: Renamed Chegeni County) The rural district was transferred to the new Chegeni District, (Note: Renamed the Central District) and the village was listed as Sarab. The 2016 census measured the population of the village as 461 people in 119 households.
