= Sarab-e Naveh Kesh =

Village in Lorestan province, Iran

Sarab-e Naveh Kesh Persian: سراب ناوه کش
- Village
- Location within Iran
- Coordinates: 33°31′49″N 48°07′11″E
- Country: Iran
- Province: Lorestan
- County: Chegeni
- District: Central
- Rural District: Dowreh

Population (2016)
  - Total: 983
- Time zone: UTC+3:30 (IRST)

Sarab-e Naveh Kesh (Persian: سراب ناوه کش) (Note: Also romanized as Sarāb-e Nāveh Kash and Sarāb-e Nāveh Kesh; formerly known as Naveh Kesh (ناوه كش), also romanized as Nāveh Kesh; also known as Naukash, Sarāb Naukash, and Sarāb-e Nowkash) is a village in Dowreh Rural District of the Central District (Note: Formerly Chegeni District) in Chegeni County, (Note: Formerly Dowreh County) Lorestan province, Iran.

== Demographics ==
=== Population ===
At the time of the 2006 National Census, the village's population, as Naveh Kesh, was 1,070 in 245 households, when it was in the former Dowreh-ye Chegeni District of Khorramabad County. The following census in 2011 counted 1,629 people in 276 households, by which time the district had been separated from the county in the establishment of Dowreh County. (Note: Renamed Chegeni County) The rural district was transferred to the new Chegeni District, (Note: Renamed the Central District) and the village was listed as Sarab-e Naveh Kesh. The 2016 census measured the population of the village as 983 people in 275 households, the most populous in its rural district.
