= Chah Cheragh =

Chah Cheragh (Persian: چاه چراغ) may refer to:

- Chah Cheragh, Kerman
- Chah Cheragh, Lorestan
