= Berekeh, Lorestan =

Village in Lorestan province, Iran

Berekeh Persian: بركه
- Village
- Location within Iran
- Coordinates: 33°32′51″N 48°00′36″E
- Country: Iran
- Province: Lorestan
- County: Chegeni
- District: Central
- Rural District: Dowreh

Population (2016)
  - Total: 554
- Time zone: UTC+3:30 (IRST)

Berekeh (Persian: بركه) (Note: Also romanized as Barkeh; also known as Sarāb-e Barkeh and Sarāb-e Berekeh) is a village in Dowreh Rural District of the Central District (Note: Formerly Chegeni District) in Chegeni County, (Note: Formerly Dowreh County) Lorestan province, Iran.

== Demographics ==
=== Population ===
At the time of the 2006 National Census, the village's population was 578 in 126 households, when it was in the former Dowreh-ye Chegeni District of Khorramabad County. The following census in 2011 counted 566 people in 154 households, by which time the district had been separated from the county in the establishment of Dowreh County. (Note: Renamed Chegeni County) The rural district was transferred to the new Chegeni District. (Note: Renamed the Central District) The 2016 census measured the population of the village as 554 people in 166 households.
