= Sarab-e Key Mirzavand =

Sarab-e Key Mirzavand (Persian: سراب كي ميرزاوند) may refer to:

- Sarab-e Key Mirzavand 1
- Sarab-e Key Mirzavand 2
