= Keryeh-ye Yek =

Village in Lorestan province, Iran

Keryeh-ye Yek Persian: کريه يک
- Village
- Location within Iran
- Country: Iran
- Province: Lorestan
- County: Chegeni
- District: Central
- Rural District: Teshkan

Population (2016)
  - Total: 58
- Time zone: UTC+3:30 (IRST)

Keryeh-ye Yek (Persian: کريه يک) (Note: Formerly known as Keryeh Sheykh Ali Khodadad (کريه شيخ علي خداداد})), also romanized as Keryeh Sheykh ʿAlī Khodādād; also known as Keryeh 3, and Khodādād (خداداد)) is a village in Teshkan Rural District of the Central District (Note: Formerly Chegeni District) in Chegeni County, (Note: Formerly Dowreh County) Lorestan province, Iran.

== Demographics ==
=== Population ===
At the time of the 2006 National Census, the village's population, as Keryeh Sheykh Ali Khodadad, was 82 in 16 households, when it was in the former Dowreh-ye Chegeni District of Khorramabad County. The following census in 2011 counted 65 people in 15 households, by which time the district had been separated from the county in the establishment of Dowreh County. (Note: Renamed Chegeni County) The rural district was transferred to the new Chegeni District, (Note: Renamed the Central District) and the village was listed as Keryeh-ye Yek. The 2016 census measured the population of the village as 58 people in 15 households.
