= Pakdasht, Lorestan =

Village in Lorestan province, Iran

Pakdasht Persian: پاکدشت
- Village
- Location within Iran
- Coordinates: 33°31′53″N 48°03′10″E
- Country: Iran
- Province: Lorestan
- County: Chegeni
- District: Central
- Rural District: Dowreh

Population (2016)
  - Total: 115
- Time zone: UTC+3:30 (IRST)

Pakdasht (Persian: پاکدشت) (Note: Also romanized as Pākdasht; formerly known as Kachalvand (كچلوند), also known as Kachālvand-e Pāpī and Kechālvand-e Pāpī) is a village in Dowreh Rural District of the Central District (Note: Formerly Chegeni District) in Chegeni County, (Note: Formerly Dowreh County) Lorestan province, Iran.

== Demographics ==
=== Population ===
At the time of the 2006 National Census, the village's population, as Kachalvand, was 142 in 27 households, when it was in the former Dowreh-ye Chegeni District of Khorramabad County. The following census in 2011 counted 109 people in 31 households, by which time the district had been separated from the county in the establishment of Dowreh County. (Note: Renamed Chegeni County) The rural district was transferred to the new Chegeni District, (Note: Renamed the Central District) and the village was listed as Pakdasht. The 2016 census measured the population of the village as 115 people in 35 households.
