= Benarkabud-e Do =

Village in Lorestan province, Iran

Benarkabud-e Do Persian: بناركبوددو
- Village
- Location within Iran
- Coordinates: 33°32′24″N 47°52′07″E
- Country: Iran
- Province: Lorestan
- County: Chegeni
- District: Shahivand
- Rural District: Kashkan-e Jonubi

Population (2016)
  - Total: 273
- Time zone: UTC+3:30 (IRST)

Benarkabud-e Do (Persian: بناركبوددو) (Note: Also romanized as Benārkabūd-e Do) is a village in Kashkan-e Jonubi Rural District of Shahivand District in Chegeni County, (Note: Formerly Dowreh County) Lorestan province, Iran.

== Demographics ==
=== Population ===
At the time of the 2006 National Census, the village's population was 263 in 56 households, when it was in Teshkan Rural District of the former Dowreh-ye Chegeni District in Khorramabad County. The following census in 2011 counted 213 people in 58 households, by which time the district had been separated from the county in the establishment of Dowreh County. (Note: Renamed Chegeni County) The rural district was transferred to the new Chegeni District, (Note: Renamed the Central District) and the village was transferred to Kashkan-e Jonubi Rural District created in the new Shahivand District. The 2016 census measured the population of the village as 273 people in 73 households.
