= Saranbar-e Sadat va Nosrati =

Village in Lorestan province, Iran

Saranbar-e Sadat va Nosrati Persian: سرانبار سادات و نصرتي
- Village
- Location within Iran
- Coordinates: 33°41′06″N 47°51′26″E
- Country: Iran
- Province: Lorestan
- County: Chegeni
- District: Central
- Rural District: Teshkan

Population (2016)
  - Total: 245
- Time zone: UTC+3:30 (IRST)

Saranbar-e Sadat va Nosrati (Persian: سرانبار سادات و نصرتي) (Note: Formerly known as Nosrati-ye Sar Anbar (نصرتي سرانبار), also romanized as Noşratī-ye Sar Anbār; also known as Noşratī-ye Sar Anbār-e Kalāntarī) is a village in Teshkan Rural District of the Central District (Note: Formerly Chegeni District) in Chegeni County, (Note: Formerly Dowreh County) Lorestan province, Iran.

== Demographics ==
=== Population ===
At the time of the 2006 National Census, the village's population, as Nosrati-ye Sar Anbar, was 310 in 64 households, when it was in the former Dowreh-ye Chegeni District of Khorramabad County. The following census in 2011 counted 329 people in 82 households, by which time the district had been separated from the county in the establishment of Dowreh County. (Note: Renamed Chegeni County) The rural district was transferred to the new Chegeni District, (Note: Renamed the Central District) and the village was listed as Saranbar-e Sadat va Nosrati. The 2016 census measured the population of the village as 245 people in 75 households.
