= Taftafineh Shams Ali =

Village in Lorestan province, Iran

Taftafineh Shams Ali Persian: تاف تافينه شمسعلي
- Village
- Location within Iran
- Coordinates: 33°41′05″N 47°51′36″E
- Country: Iran
- Province: Lorestan
- County: Chegeni
- District: Central
- Rural District: Teshkan

Population (2016)
  - Total: 249
- Time zone: UTC+3:30 (IRST)

Taftafineh Shams Ali (Persian: تاف تافينه شمسعلي) (Note: Also romanized as Tāftāfīneh Shams ʿAlī; also known as Tāftāfīneh) is a village in Teshkan Rural District of the Central District (Note: Formerly Chegeni District) in Chegeni County, (Note: Formerly Dowreh County) Lorestan province, Iran.

== Demographics ==
=== Population ===
At the time of the 2006 National Census, the village's population was 223 in 46 households, when it was in the former Dowreh-ye Chegeni District of Khorramabad County. The following census in 2011 counted 270 people in 77 households, by which time the district had been separated from the county in the establishment of Dowreh County. (Note: Renamed Chegeni County) The rural district was transferred to the new Chegeni District. (Note: Renamed the Central District) The 2016 census measured the population of the village as 249 people in 71 households.
