= Moradabad, Chegeni =

Village in Lorestan province, Iran

Moradabad Persian: مراداباد
- Village
- Location within Iran
- Coordinates: 33°35′28″N 47°52′17″E
- Country: Iran
- Province: Lorestan
- County: Chegeni
- District: Central
- Rural District: Teshkan

Population (2016)
  - Total: 46
- Time zone: UTC+3:30 (IRST)

Moradabad (Persian: مراداباد) (Note: Also romanized as Morādābād) is a village in Teshkan Rural District of the Central District (Note: Formerly Chegeni District) in Chegeni County, (Note: Formerly Dowreh County) Lorestan province, Iran.

== Demographics ==
=== Population ===
At the time of the 2006 National Census, the village's population was 43 in 12 households, when it was in the former Dowreh-ye Chegeni District of Khorramabad County. The following census in 2011 counted 52 people in 12 households, by which time the district had been separated from the county in the establishment of Dowreh County. (Note: Renamed Chegeni County) The rural district was transferred to the new Chegeni District. (Note: Renamed the Central District) The 2016 census measured the population of the village as 46 people in 11 households.
