= Valiabad-e Shiri =

Village in Lorestan province, Iran

Valiabad-e Shiri Persian: ولي آباد شيري
- Village
- Location within Iran
- Coordinates: 33°31′21″N 47°48′12″E
- Country: Iran
- Province: Lorestan
- County: Chegeni
- District: Shahivand
- Rural District: Kashkan-e Jonubi

Population (2016)
  - Total: 226
- Time zone: UTC+3:30 (IRST)

Valiabad-e Shiri (Persian: ولي آباد شيري) (Note: Also romanized as Valīābād-e Shīrī; also known as Valīābād-e Chenār) is a village in Kashkan-e Jonubi Rural District of Shahivand District in Chegeni County, (Note: Formerly Dowreh County) Lorestan province, Iran.

== Demographics ==
=== Population ===
At the time of the 2006 National Census, the village's population was 232 in 49 households, when it was in Teshkan Rural District of the former Dowreh-ye Chegeni District in Khorramabad County. The following census in 2011 counted 214 people in 51 households, by which time the district had been separated from the county in the establishment of Dowreh County. (Note: Renamed Chegeni County) The rural district was transferred to the new Chegeni District, (Note: Renamed the Central District) and the village was transferred to Kashkan-e Jonubi Rural District created in the new Shahivand District. The 2016 census measured the population of the village as 226 people in 55 households.
