= Cham Chareh =

Cham Chareh or Cham Chara (Persian: چم چره) may refer to:

- Cham Chareh 1
- Cham Chareh 2
- Cham Chareh 3

== See also ==
- Chareh (disambiguation)
