= Chah-e Zu ol Faqar =

Village in Lorestan province, Iran

Chah-e Zu ol Faqar Persian: چاه ذوالفقار
- Village
- Location within Iran
- Coordinates: 33°37′15″N 47°53′20″E
- Country: Iran
- Province: Lorestan
- County: Chegeni
- District: Central
- Rural District: Teshkan

Population (2016)
  - Total: 492
- Time zone: UTC+3:30 (IRST)

Chah-e Zu ol Faqar (Persian: چاه ذوالفقار) is a village in, and the capital of, Teshkan Rural District in the Central District (Note: Formerly Chegeni District) of Chegeni County, (Note: Formerly Dowreh County) Lorestan province, Iran.

== Demographics ==
=== Population ===
At the time of the 2006 National Census, the village's population was 588 in 117 households, when it was in the former Dowreh-ye Chegeni District of Khorramabad County. The following census in 2011 counted 484 people in 121 households, by which time the district had been separated from the county in the establishment of Dowreh County. (Note: Renamed Chegeni County) The rural district was transferred to the new Chegeni District. (Note: Renamed the Central District) The 2016 census measured the population of the village as 492 people in 134 households, the most populous in its rural district.
