= Keryeh-ye Do =

Village in Lorestan province, Iran

Keryeh-ye Do Persian: کريه دو
- Village
- Location within Iran
- Coordinates: 33°41′07″N 47°50′06″E
- Country: Iran
- Province: Lorestan
- County: Chegeni
- District: Central
- Rural District: Teshkan

Population (2016)
  - Total: 157
- Time zone: UTC+3:30 (IRST)

Keryeh-ye Do (Persian: کريه دو) (Note: Formerly known as Abbasi (عباسي), also romanized as ‘Abbāsī; also known as ‘Abbās and Abbasabad) is a village in Teshkan Rural District of the Central District (Note: Formerly Chegeni District) in Chegeni County, (Note: Formerly Dowreh County) Lorestan province, Iran.

== Demographics ==
=== Population ===
At the time of the 2006 National Census, the village's population, as Abbasi, was 190 in 46 households, when it was in the former Dowreh-ye Chegeni District of Khorramabad County. The following census in 2011 counted 169 people in 44 households, by which time the district had been separated from the county in the establishment of Dowreh County. (Note: Renamed Chegeni County) The rural district was transferred to the new Chegeni District, (Note: Renamed the Central District) and the village was listed as Keryeh-ye Do. The 2016 census measured the population of the village as 157 people in 45 households.
