= Sarab-e Key Gar-e Sheykhan-e Yek =

Village in Lorestan province, Iran

Sarab-e Key Gar-e Sheykhan-e Yek Persian: سراب کي گر شيخان يک
- Village
- Location within Iran
- Coordinates: 33°32′37″N 48°09′00″E
- Country: Iran
- Province: Lorestan
- County: Chegeni
- District: Central
- Rural District: Dowreh

Population (2016)
  - Total: 41
- Time zone: UTC+3:30 (IRST)

Sarab-e Key Gar-e Sheykhan-e Yek (Persian: سراب کي گر شيخان يک) (Note: Formerly known as Rahim Hatam-e Yek (رحيم حاتم يك), also romanized as Raḥīm Hātam-e Yek; also known as Rahim Hatami-ye Yek and Raḥīm Hātami-ye Yek) is a village in Dowreh Rural District of the Central District (Note: Formerly Chegeni District) in Chegeni County, (Note: Formerly Dowreh County) Lorestan province, Iran.

== Demographics ==
=== Population ===
At the time of the 2006 National Census, the village's population, as Rahim Hatam-e Yek, was 48 in 11 households, when it was in the former Dowreh-ye Chegeni District of Khorramabad County. The following census in 2011 counted 33 people in eight households, by which time the district had been separated from the county in the establishment of Dowreh County. (Note: Renamed Chegeni County) The rural district was transferred to the new Chegeni District, (Note: Renamed the Central District) and the village was listed as Sarab-e Key Gar-e Sheykhan-e Yek. The 2016 census measured the population of the village as 41 people in 13 households.
