= Qasemali-ye Bar Aftab =

Village in Lorestan province, Iran

Qasemali-ye Bar Aftab Persian: قاسمعلي برافتاب
- Village
- Location within Iran
- Coordinates: 33°35′11″N 47°54′37″E
- Country: Iran
- Province: Lorestan
- County: Chegeni
- District: Central
- Rural District: Teshkan

Population (2016)
  - Total: 170
- Time zone: UTC+3:30 (IRST)

Qasemali-ye Bar Aftab (Persian: قاسمعلي برافتاب) (Note: Also romanized as Qāsem‘alī-ye Bar Āftāb; also known as Bar Āftāb and Bar Āftāb-e Qāsem‘alī) is a village in Teshkan Rural District of the Central District (Note: Formerly Chegeni District) in Chegeni County, (Note: Formerly Dowreh County) Lorestan province, Iran.

== Demographics ==
=== Population ===
At the time of the 2006 National Census, the village's population was 176 in 36 households, when it was in the former Dowreh-ye Chegeni District of Khorramabad County. The following census in 2011 counted 169 people in 47 households, by which time the district had been separated from the county in the establishment of Dowreh County. (Note: Renamed Chegeni County) The rural district was transferred to the new Chegeni District. (Note: Renamed the Central District) The 2016 census measured the population of the village as 170 people in 54 households.
