= Pir Shams ol Din, Lorestan =

Village in Lorestan province, Iran

Pir Shams ol Din Persian: پير شمس الدين
- Village
- Location within Iran
- Coordinates: 33°41′46″N 47°52′08″E
- Country: Iran
- Province: Lorestan
- County: Chegeni
- District: Central
- Rural District: Teshkan

Population (2016)
  - Total: 153
- Time zone: UTC+3:30 (IRST)

Pir Shams ol Din (Persian: پير شمس الدين) (Note: Also romanized as Pīr Shams ol Dīn; formerly known as Shams ol Din (شمس الدين), also romanized as Shams ol Dīn) is a village in Teshkan Rural District of the Central District (Note: Formerly Chegeni District) in Chegeni County, (Note: Formerly Dowreh County) Lorestan province, Iran.

== Demographics ==
=== Population ===
At the time of the 2006 National Census, the village's population, as Shams ol Din, was 137 in 27 households, when it was in the former Dowreh-ye Chegeni District of Khorramabad County. The following census in 2011 counted 126 people in 32 households, by which time the district had been separated from the county in the establishment of Dowreh County. (Note: Renamed Chegeni County) The rural district was transferred to the new Chegeni District, (Note: Renamed the Central District) and the village was listed as Pir Shams ol Din. The 2016 census measured the population of the village as 153 people in 43 households.
