= Amirabad, Chegeni =

Village in Lorestan province, Iran

Amirabad Persian: امير آباد
- Village
- Location within Iran
- Coordinates: 33°34′14″N 47°54′59″E
- Country: Iran
- Province: Lorestan
- County: Chegeni
- District: Central
- Rural District: Teshkan

Population (2016)
  - Total: 456
- Time zone: UTC+3:30 (IRST)

Amirabad (Persian: اميراباد) (Note: Also romanized as Amīrābād; formerly known as Amirabad Cham Gaz (اميرابادچم گز), also romanized as Amīrābād Cham Gaz) is a village in Teshkan Rural District of the Central District (Note: Formerly Chegeni District) in Chegeni County, (Note: Formerly Dowreh County) Lorestan province, Iran.

== Demographics ==
=== Population ===
At the time of the 2006 National Census, the village's population, as Amirabad Cham Gaz, was 458 in 99 households, when it was in the former Dowreh-ye Chegeni District of Khorramabad County. The following census in 2011 counted 469 people in 122 households, by which time the district had been separated from the county in the establishment of Dowreh County. (Note: Renamed Chegeni County) The rural district was transferred to the new Chegeni District, (Note: Renamed the Central District) and the village was listed as Amirabad. The 2016 census measured the population of the village as 456 people in 123 households.
