= Chahar Meleh Gel Sorkheh =

Village in Lorestan province, Iran

Chahar Meleh Gel Sorkheh Persian: چهارمله گل سرخه
- Village
- Location within Iran
- Coordinates: 33°34′58″N 47°58′53″E
- Country: Iran
- Province: Lorestan
- County: Chegeni
- District: Central
- Rural District: Dowreh

Population (2016)
  - Total: 177
- Time zone: UTC+3:30 (IRST)

Chahar Meleh Gel Sorkheh (Persian: چهارمله گل سرخه) (Note: Also romanized as Chahār Meleh Gel Sorkheh; also known as Gel Sorkheh and Kol Sorkheh-ye Mīshākhvor) is a village in Dowreh Rural District of the Central District (Note: Formerly Chegeni District) in Chegeni County, (Note: Formerly Dowreh County) Lorestan province, Iran.

== Demographics ==
=== Population ===
At the time of the 2006 National Census, the village's population was 179 in 42 households, when it was in the former Dowreh-ye Chegeni District of Khorramabad County. The following census in 2011 counted 193 people in 50 households, by which time the district had been separated from the county in the establishment of Dowreh County. (Note: Renamed Chegeni County) The rural district was transferred to the new Chegeni District. (Note: Renamed the Central District) The 2016 census measured the population of the village as 174 people in 49 households.
