= Koleh Ney =

Koleh Ney (Persian: كله ني) may refer to:

- Koleh Ney, Dowreh
- Koleh Ney, Khorramabad
