= Panesar-e Tashkan =

Village in Lorestan province, Iran

Panesar-e Tashkan Persian: پانسار تشکن
- Village
- Location within Iran
- Coordinates: 33°40′21″N 47°52′48″E
- Country: Iran
- Province: Lorestan
- County: Chegeni
- District: Central
- Rural District: Teshkan

Population (2016)
  - Total: 415
- Time zone: UTC+3:30 (IRST)

Panesar-e Tashkan (Persian: پانسار تشکن) (Note: Also romanized as Pānesār-e Tashkan; also known as Pānesār-e Bārānī (پانسار باراني) and Bārānī) is a village in Teshkan Rural District of the Central District (Note: Formerly Chegeni District) in Chegeni County, (Note: Formerly Dowreh County) Lorestan province, Iran.

== Demographics ==
=== Population ===
At the time of the 2006 National Census, the village's population was 585 in 111 households, when it was in the former Dowreh-ye Chegeni District of Khorramabad County. The following census in 2011 counted 555 people in 117 households, by which time the district had been separated from the county in the establishment of Dowreh County. (Note: Renamed Chegeni County) The rural district was transferred to the new Chegeni District. (Note: Renamed the Central District) The 2016 census measured the population of the village as 415 people in 105 households.
