= Sadat-e Tashkan =

Village in Lorestan province, Iran

Sadat-e Tashkan Persian: سادات تشکن
- Village
- Location within Iran
- Coordinates: 33°40′23″N 47°51′15″E
- Country: Iran
- Province: Lorestan
- County: Chegeni
- District: Central
- Rural District: Teshkan

Population (2016)
  - Total: 91
- Time zone: UTC+3:30 (IRST)

Sadat-e Tashkan (Persian: سادات تشکن) (Note: Also romanized as Sādāt-e Tashkan; formerly known as Tashkan-e Sadat (تشکن سادات), also romanized as Tashkan-e Sādāt; also known as Tashkan, Tīshkhīn, Tīshkīn, and Tashkan-e Seyyedya (تشکن سيديا)) is a village in Teshkan Rural District of the Central District (Note: Formerly Chegeni District) in Chegeni County, (Note: Formerly Dowreh County) Lorestan province, Iran.

== Demographics ==
=== Population ===
At the time of the 2006 National Census, the village's population, as Tashkan-e Sadat, was 90 in 20 households, when it was in the former Dowreh-ye Chegeni District of Khorramabad County. The following census in 2011 counted 85 people in 22 households, by which time the district had been separated from the county in the establishment of Dowreh County. (Note: Renamed Chegeni County) The rural district was transferred to the new Chegeni District, (Note: Renamed the Central District) and the village was listed as Sadat-e Tashkan. The 2016 census measured the population of the village as 91 people in 23 households.
