= Bon Mazraeh =

Village in Lorestan province, Iran

Bon Mazraeh Persian: سرانبار سادات و نصرتي
- Village
- Location within Iran
- Coordinates: 33°40′00″N 47°49′31″E
- Country: Iran
- Province: Lorestan
- County: Chegeni
- District: Central
- Rural District: Teshkan

Population (2016)
  - Total: 245
- Time zone: UTC+3:30 (IRST)

Bon Mazraeh (Persian: بن مزرعه) (Note: Also romanized as Bon Mazra‘eh) is a village in Teshkan Rural District of the Central District (Note: Formerly Chegeni District) in Chegeni County, (Note: Formerly Dowreh County) Lorestan province, Iran.

== Demographics ==
=== Population ===
At the time of the 2006 National Census, the village's population was 178 in 33 households, when it was in the former Dowreh-ye Chegeni District of Khorramabad County. The following census in 2011 counted 182 people in 38 households, by which time the district had been separated from the county in the establishment of Dowreh County. (Note: Renamed Chegeni County) The rural district was transferred to the new Chegeni District. (Note: Renamed the Central District) The 2016 census measured the population of the village as 204 people in 54 households.
