= Darreh, Lorestan =

Village in Lorestan province, Iran

Darreh Persian: دره
- Village
- Location within Iran
- Country: Iran
- Province: Lorestan
- County: Chegeni
- District: Central
- Rural District: Teshkan

Population (2016)
  - Total: 144
- Time zone: UTC+3:30 (IRST)

Darreh (Persian: دره) (Note: Formerly known as Zurancham (زوران چم), also romanized as Zūrāncham; also known as Zaravān Cham) is a village in Teshkan Rural District of the Central District (Note: Formerly Chegeni District) in Chegeni County, (Note: Formerly Dowreh County) Lorestan province, Iran.

== Demographics ==
=== Population ===
At the time of the 2006 National Census, the village's population, as Zurancham, was 126 in 28 households, when it was in the former Dowreh-ye Chegeni District of Khorramabad County. The following census in 2011 counted 153 people in 37 households, by which time the district had been separated from the county in the establishment of Dowreh County. (Note: Renamed Chegeni County) The rural district was transferred to the new Chegeni District, (Note: Renamed the Central District) and the village was listed as Darreh. The 2016 census measured the population of the village as 144 people in 39 households.
