= Rahimabad-e Seh =

Village in Lorestan province, Iran

Rahimabad-e Seh Persian: رحيم ابادسه
- Village
- Location within Iran
- Country: Iran
- Province: Lorestan
- County: Chegeni
- District: Central
- Rural District: Dowreh

Population (2016)
  - Total: 37
- Time zone: UTC+3:30 (IRST)

Rahimabad-e Seh (Persian: رحيم ابادسه) (Note: Also romanized as Rahimabad Seh, Rahīmābād Seh, and Rahīmābād-e Seh; also known as Rahīmābād and Raḩīmī) is a village in Dowreh Rural District of the Central District (Note: Formerly Chegeni District) in Chegeni County, (Note: Formerly Dowreh County) Lorestan province, Iran.

== Demographics ==
=== Population ===
At the time of the 2006 National Census, the village's population was 51 in 16 households, when it was in the former Dowreh-ye Chegeni District of Khorramabad County. The following census in 2011 counted 52 people in 16 households, by which time the district had been separated from the county in the establishment of Dowreh County. (Note: Renamed Chegeni County) The rural district was transferred to the new Chegeni District. (Note: Renamed the Central District) The 2016 census measured the population of the village as 37 people in 11 households.
