= Dowreh =

Dowreh (Persian: دوره) may refer to:

- Dowreh County
- Dowreh Rural District
