= Darb, Lorestan =

Village in Lorestan province, Iran

Darb Persian: درب
- Village
- Location within Iran
- Coordinates: 33°33′30″N 48°05′46″E
- Country: Iran
- Province: Lorestan
- County: Chegeni
- District: Central
- Rural District: Dowreh

Population (2016)
  - Total: 245
- Time zone: UTC+3:30 (IRST)

Darb (Persian: درب) (Note: Formerly known as Darb-e Chah (دربچاه), also romanized as Darb-e Chāh) is a village in Dowreh Rural District of the Central District (Note: Formerly Chegeni District) in Chegeni County, (Note: Formerly Dowreh County) Lorestan province, Iran.

== Demographics ==
=== Population ===
At the time of the 2006 National Census, the village's population, as Darb-e Chah, was 269 in 58 households, when it was in the former Dowreh-ye Chegeni District of Khorramabad County. The following census in 2011 counted 241 people in 62 households, by which time the district had been separated from the county in the establishment of Dowreh County. (Note: Renamed Chegeni County) The rural district was transferred to the new Chegeni District, (Note: Renamed the Central District) and the village was listed as Darb. The 2016 census measured the population of the village as 245 people in 71 households.
