= Lareh Sabzi =

Village in Lorestan province, Iran

Lareh Sabzi Persian: لره سبزي
- Village
- Location within Iran
- Country: Iran
- Province: Lorestan
- County: Chegeni
- District: Central
- Rural District: Dowreh

Population (2016)
  - Total: 55
- Time zone: UTC+3:30 (IRST)

Lareh Sabzi (Persian: لره سبزي) (Note: Also romanized as Lareh Sabzī; also known as Darreh Sabzī and Lareh Sabzī-ye Gel Sorkheh) is a village in Dowreh Rural District of the Central District (Note: Formerly Chegeni District) in Chegeni County, (Note: Formerly Dowreh County) Lorestan province, Iran.

== Demographics ==
=== Population ===
At the time of the 2006 National Census, the village's population was 74 in 18 households, when it was in the former Dowreh-ye Chegeni District of Khorramabad County. The following census in 2011 counted 53 people in 12 households, by which time the district had been separated from the county in the establishment of Dowreh County. (Note: Renamed Chegeni County) The rural district was transferred to the new Chegeni District. (Note: Renamed the Central District) The 2016 census measured the population of the village as 55 people in 14 households.
