= Chareh =

Chareh or Chereh or Chorreh or Chorrah or Choreh (Persian: چاره or چره) may refer to various places in Iran:

- Chorreh, Gilan (چره - Chorreh')
- Chareh, Khuzestan (چاره - Chāreh)
- Chareh, Amol (چاره - Chāreh), Mazandaran Province
- Chareh, Babol (چاره - Chāreh), Mazandaran Province
- Chareh, West Azerbaijan (چره - Chareh)

== See also ==
- Cham Chareh (disambiguation)
