= Nur Mohammad Khan, Lorestan =

Village in Lorestan province, Iran

Nur Mohammad Khan Persian: نورمحمدخان
- Village
- Location within Iran
- Country: Iran
- Province: Lorestan
- County: Chegeni
- District: Central
- Rural District: Teshkan

Population (2016)
  - Total: 81
- Time zone: UTC+3:30 (IRST)

Nur Mohammad Khan (Persian: نورمحمدخان) (Note: Also romanized as Nūr Moḥammad Khān; formerly known as Bizhanvand (بيژنوند), also romanized as Bīzhanvand) is a village in Teshkan Rural District of the Central District (Note: Formerly Chegeni District) in Chegeni County, (Note: Formerly Dowreh County) Lorestan province, Iran.

== Demographics ==
=== Population ===
At the time of the 2006 National Census, the village's population, as Bizhanvand, was 232 in 55 households, when it was in the former Dowreh-ye Chegeni District of Khorramabad County. The following census in 2011 counted 217 people in 58 households, by which time the district had been separated from the county in the establishment of Dowreh County. (Note: Renamed Chegeni County) The rural district was transferred to the new Chegeni District. (Note: Renamed the Central District) The 2016 census recorded the population of the village, listed as Nur Mohammad Khan, at 81 people in 23 households.
