= Hezar Mani =

Village in Lorestan province, Iran

Hezar Mani Persian: هزارمني
- Village
- Location within Iran
- Coordinates: 33°37′56″N 47°53′09″E
- Country: Iran
- Province: Lorestan
- County: Chegeni
- District: Central
- Rural District: Teshkan

Population (2016)
  - Total: 58
- Time zone: UTC+3:30 (IRST)

Hezar Mani (Persian: هزارمني) (Note: Also romanized as Hezār Manī, also known as Hezār Manī-ye Barāftāb) is a village in Teshkan Rural District of the Central District (Note: Formerly Chegeni District) in Chegeni County, (Note: Formerly Dowreh County) Lorestan province, Iran.

== Demographics ==
=== Population ===
At the time of the 2006 National Census, the village's population was 83 in 17 households, when it was in the former Dowreh-ye Chegeni District of Khorramabad County. The following census in 2011 counted 56 people in 13 households, by which time the district had been separated from the county in the establishment of Dowreh County. (Note: Renamed Chegeni County) The rural district was transferred to the new Chegeni District. (Note: Renamed the Central District) The 2016 census measured the population of the village as 58 people in 15 households.
