= Meleh-ye Shabanan =

Village in Lorestan province, Iran

Meleh-ye Shabanan Persian: مله شبانان
- Village
- Location within Iran
- Country: Iran
- Province: Lorestan
- County: Chegeni
- District: Central
- Rural District: Dowreh

Population (2016)
  - Total: 32
- Time zone: UTC+3:30 (IRST)

Meleh-ye Shabanan (Persian: مله شبانان) (Note: Also romanized as Maleh Shabānān and Meleh-ye Shabānān; also known as Maleh Shabānān-e Yek and Mele Shabānān) is a village in Dowreh Rural District of the Central District (Note: Formerly Chegeni District) in Chegeni County, (Note: Formerly Dowreh County) Lorestan province, Iran.

== Demographics ==
=== Population ===
At the time of the 2006 National Census, the village's population was 32 in six households, when it was in the former Dowreh-ye Chegeni District of Khorramabad County. The following census in 2011 counted 37 people in 10 households, by which time the district had been separated from the county in the establishment of Dowreh County. (Note: Renamed Chegeni County) The rural district was transferred to the new Chegeni District. (Note: Renamed the Central District) The 2016 census measured the population of the village as 32 people in nine households.
