= Kolehu =

Kolehu or Koleh Hu or Kalah Hu or Kolah Hu (Persian: كله هو) may refer to:

- Kolah Hu, Kermanshah
- Kolehu, Lorestan
