= Key Bar Aftab =

Village in Lorestan province, Iran

Key Bar Aftab Persian: كي برافتاب
- Village
- Location within Iran
- Coordinates: 33°36′46″N 47°53′55″E
- Country: Iran
- Province: Lorestan
- County: Chegeni
- District: Central
- Rural District: Teshkan

Population (2016)
  - Total: 137
- Time zone: UTC+3:30 (IRST)

Key Bar Aftab (Persian: كي برافتاب) (Note: Also romanized as Key Bar Āftāb; also known as Kay Baraftab (كي برافتاب), also romanized as Kay Barāftāb) is a village in Teshkan Rural District of the Central District (Note: Formerly Chegeni District) in Chegeni County, (Note: Formerly Dowreh County) Lorestan province, Iran.

== Demographics ==
=== Population ===
At the time of the 2006 National Census, the village's population was 144 in 26 households, when it was in the former Dowreh-ye Chegeni District of Khorramabad County. The following census in 2011 counted 127 people in 32 households, by which time the district had been separated from the county in the establishment of Dowreh County. (Note: Renamed Chegeni County) The rural district was transferred to the new Chegeni District. (Note: Renamed the Central District) The 2016 census measured the population of the village as 137 people in 38 households.
