= Darreh-ye Badam =

Village in Lorestan province, Iran

Darreh-ye Badam Persian: دره بادام
- Village
- Location within Iran
- Coordinates: 33°36′02″N 48°00′53″E
- Country: Iran
- Province: Lorestan
- County: Chegeni
- District: Central
- Rural District: Dowreh

Population (2016)
  - Total: 542
- Time zone: UTC+3:30 (IRST)

Darreh-ye Badam (Persian: دره بادام) (Note: Also romanized as Darreh-ye Bādām) is a village in Dowreh Rural District of the Central District (Note: Formerly Chegeni District) in Chegeni County, (Note: Formerly Dowreh County) Lorestan province, Iran.

== Demographics ==
=== Population ===
At the time of the 2006 National Census, the village's population was 584 in 133 households, when it was in the former Dowreh-ye Chegeni District of Khorramabad County. The following census in 2011 counted 600 people in 168 households, by which time the district had been separated from the county in the establishment of Dowreh County. (Note: Renamed Chegeni County) The rural district was transferred to the new Chegeni District. (Note: Renamed the Central District) The 2016 census measured the population of the village as 542 people in 157 households.
