= Vahid Amiri =

Iranian footballer

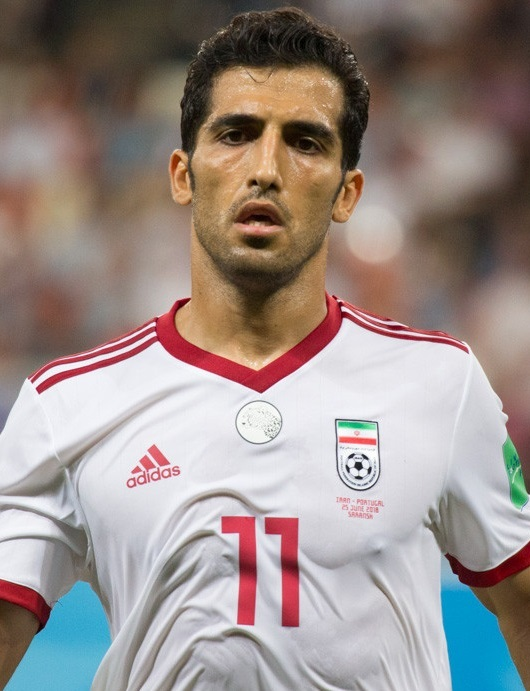
- Amiri with Iran at the 2018 FIFA World Cup

Personal information
- Full name: Vahid Amiri
- Date of birth: 2 April 1988 (age 38)
- Place of birth: Darreh-ye Badam, Khorramabad, Iran
- Height: 1.79 m (5 ft 10 in)
- Position: Winger

Team information
- Current team: Foolad
- Number: 11

Senior career*
Years	Team	Apps	(Gls)
2008–2009	Datis		
2009–2010	Kowsar		
2010–2011	Gahar Zagros		
2011–2013	Naft MIS	48	(2)
2013–2016	Naft Tehran	79	(11)
2016–2018	Persepolis	51	(8)
2018–2019	Trabzonspor	22	(1)
2019–2025	Persepolis	139	(13)
2025–	Foolad	15	(3)

International career
2015–2023	Iran	72	(2)
Medal record
Representing Iran
CAFA Nations Cup
Winner	2023 Kyrgyzstan – Uzbekistan	Team
- * Club domestic league appearances and goals as of 4 October 2025

Vahid Amiri (Persian: وحید امیری; born 2 April 1988) is an Iranian professional footballer who plays mainly as a winger for Persian Gulf Pro League club Foolad. He has also represented Iran national team in the past.

Amiri represented the Iran at the 2015 and 2019 AFC Asian Cups and also the 2018 FIFA World Cup. He predominantly plays as a left winger but can play in all attacking positions.

== Club career ==
Amiri started his career with Datis Lorestan. He left Gahar Zagros in the summer of 2011 and Naft Masjed Soleyman and spent two seasons with them.

=== Naft Tehran ===
In May 2013 he joined Naft Tehran with a two-year contract. Amiri scored his first goal for Naft on 6 August 2013 in a 1–1 draw against Damash Gilan. He scored his first Asian Champions League on 7 April 2015 in a 3–0 away win against Saudi club Al-Shabab. Amiri scored on 16 September 2015 in a 2–1 loss to Al-Ahli Dubai in the quarter–finals of the Asian Champions League.

=== Persepolis ===
Amiri joined Persepolis in summer of 2016 with a two years contract. He won two league with Persepolis and was named Iranian Footballer of the Year in 2018. He played 74 games and scored 9 goals for his team.

=== Trabzonspor ===
On 21 July 2018, Amiri agreed to a two-year contract with Turkish Giants Trabzonspor.

=== Persepolis ===
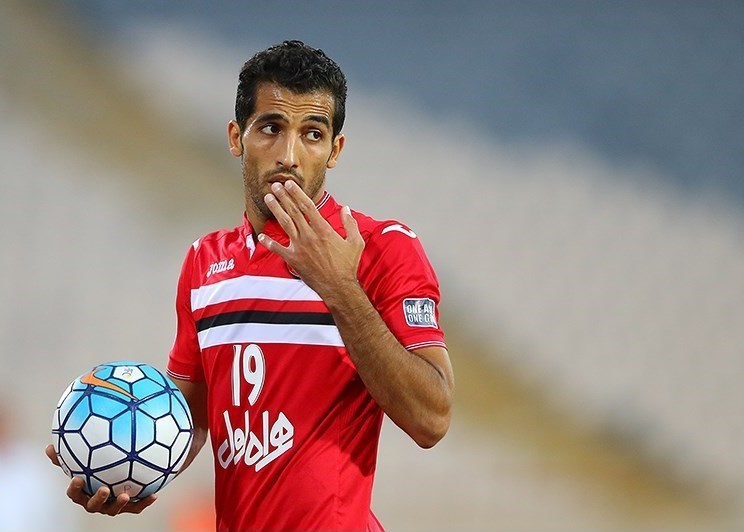
Amiri with Persepolis in the 2017 AFC Champions League

On 13 July 2019, Amiri signed a two-year contract with Persian Gulf Pro League champions Persepolis. After returning to Persepolis, He said:

I am very happy to return to Persepolis once again. I had several offers from the other Iranian teams but I opted to return to my home.

Also clubs No. 19 was given to Amiri.

== International career ==
He was called into Iran's 2015 AFC Asian Cup squad on 30 December 2014 by Carlos Queiroz. He made his debut on a friendly against Iraq on 4 January 2015. He missed a decisive penalty against Iraq which lead to elimination of Iran from Asian Cup 2015. Amiri scored his first international goal in a 2–0 victory against Chile.

In May 2018 he was named in Iran's preliminary squad for the 2018 FIFA World Cup in Russia.

== Personal life ==
Amiri was born in the small village of Darreh-ye Badam in Khorramabad, Lorestan Province. He has a degree in law and as of January 2016 is studying for his master's degree in Physical Education.

== Career statistics ==
=== Club ===
As of match played 4 October 2025

Appearances and goals by club, season and competition
Club	Season	League			Cup		Continental		Other		Total	
Club	Season	Division	Apps	Goals	Apps	Goals	Apps	Goals	Apps	Goals	Apps	Goals
Naft MIS	2011–12	Division 1	23	2	1	0	—		—		24	2
Naft MIS	2012–13	Division 1	25	0	1	0	—		—		26	0
Naft MIS	Total		48	2	2	0	—		—		50	2
Naft Tehran	2013–14	Pro League	26	2	2	0	—		—		28	2
Naft Tehran	2014–15	Pro League	25	4	2	1	11	2	—		38	7
Naft Tehran	2015–16	Pro League	28	5	2	0	1	0	—		31	5
Naft Tehran	Total		79	11	6	1	12	2	—		97	14
Persepolis	2016–17	Pro League	25	6	0	0	12	1	—		37	7
Persepolis	2017–18	Pro League	26	2	2	0	8	0	1	0	37	2
Persepolis	Total		51	8	2	0	20	1	1	0	74	9
Trabzonspor	2018–19	Süper Lig	22	1	4	2	—		—		26	3
Persepolis	2019–20	Pro League	26	6	4	1	2	0	0	0	32	7
Persepolis	2020–21	Pro League	28	3	2	0	13	1	0	0	43	4
Persepolis	2021–22	Pro League	24	1	1	1	2	0	1	0	28	2
Persepolis	2022–23	Pro League	24	0	5	1	—		—		29	1
Persepolis	2023–24	Pro League	19	0	2	0	2	0	—		23	0
Persepolis	2024–25	Pro League	18	3	1	0	6	0	0	0	25	3
Persepolis	Total		139	13	15	3	25	1	1	0	180	17
Foolad	2025–26	Pro League	4	0	0	0	—		—		4	0
Career total			343	35	29	6	57	4	2	0	431	45

=== International ===
As of match played 20 June 2023

Appearances and goals by national team and year
National team	Year	Apps	Goals
Iran	2015	12	1
Iran	2016	9	0
Iran	2017	9	0
Iran	2018	12	0
Iran	2019	10	0
Iran	2020	2	0
Iran	2021	9	1
Iran	2022	5	0
Iran	2023	3	0
Total		71	2

Scores and results list Iran's goal tally first, score column indicates score after each Amiri goal.

List of international goals scored by Vahid Amiri
No.	Date	Venue	Opponent	Score	Result	Competition
1	26 March 2015	NV Arena, Sankt Pölten, Austria	Chile	2–0	2–0	Friendly
2	3 June 2021	Al Muharraq Stadium, Arad, Bahrain	Hong Kong	2–0	3–1	2022 FIFA World Cup qualification

== Honours ==
Naft Tehran

- Hazfi Cup runner-up: 2014–15

Persepolis

- Persian Gulf Pro League: 2016–17, 2017–18, 2019–20, 2020–21, 2022–23, 2023–24
- Hazfi Cup: 2022–23
- Iranian Super Cup: 2017, 2018, 2020; runner-Up: 2021
- AFC Champions League runner-up: 2020

Individual

- Persian Gulf Pro League Team of the Year: 2016–17, 2017–18
- Iranian Footballer of the Year: 2018
