= Cham Khusheh Safar Ali =

Village in Lorestan province, Iran

Cham Khusheh Safar Ali Persian: چم خوشه صفرعلي
- Village
- Location within Iran
- Coordinates: 33°38′40″N 47°50′04″E
- Country: Iran
- Province: Lorestan
- County: Chegeni
- District: Shahivand
- Rural District: Kashkan-e Jonubi

Population (2016)
  - Total: 728
- Time zone: UTC+3:30 (IRST)

Cham Khusheh Safar Ali (Persian: چم خوشه صفرعلي) (Note: Also romanized as Cham Khūsheh Safar ʿAlī) is a village in Kashkan-e Jonubi Rural District of Shahivand District in Chegeni County, (Note: Formerly Dowreh County) Lorestan province, Iran.

== Demographics ==
=== Population ===
At the time of the 2006 National Census, the village's population was 211 in 47 households, when it was in Kashkan Rural District (Note: Renamed Kashkan-e Shomali Rural District) of the former Dowreh-ye Chegeni District in Khorramabad County. The following census in 2011 counted 645 people in 150 households, by which time the district had been separated from the county in the establishment of Dowreh County. (Note: Renamed Chegeni County) The rural district was transferred to the new Shahivand District and renamed Kashkan-e Shomali Rural District. Cham Khusheh Safar Ali was transferred to Kashkan-e Jonubi Rural District created in the same district. The 2016 census measured the population of the village as 728 people in 195 households.
