= Kashkan-e Jonubi Rural District =

Rural district in Lorestan province, Iran

Kashkan-e Jonubi Rural District Persian: دهستان کشکان جنوبی
- Rural District
- Location within Iran
- Coordinates: 33°35′N 47°50′E
- Country: Iran
- Province: Lorestan
- County: Chegeni
- District: Shahivand
- Established: 2007
- Capital: Khatereh

Population (2016)
  - Total: 6,379
- Time zone: UTC+3:30 (IRST)

Kashkan-e Jonubi Rural District (Persian: دهستان کشکان جنوبی) is in Shahivand District of Chegeni County, (Note: Formerly Dowreh County) Lorestan province, Iran. Its capital is the village of Khatereh.

== History ==
In 2007, Dowreh-ye Chegeni and Veysian Districts were separated from Khorramabad County in the establishment of Dowreh County, (Note: Renamed Chegeni County) which was divided into three districts of two rural districts each, with the city of Sarab-e Dowreh as its capital. Kashkan-e Jonubi Rural District was created in the new Shahivand District. The county was renamed Chegeni County in 2019.

== Demographics ==
=== Population ===
At the time of the 2011 National Census, the rural district's population was 6,496 in 1,595 households. The 2016 census measured the population of the rural district as 6,379 in 1,794 households. The most populous of its 29 villages was Koleh Hu, with 1,107 people.

=== Other villages in the rural district ===
- Benarkabud-e Do
- Benarkabud-e Seh
- Benarkabud-e Yek
- Cham Davud
- Cham Khusheh Safar Ali
- Cham Puneh
- Charkhestaneh
- Chenar-e Bala
- Chenar-e Pain
- Cheshmeh Jumileh
- Cheshmeh Sard
- Cheshmeh-ye Zamzam
- Darreh Rahmaneh
- Dul Gavmishan
- Hoseynabad Shahivand
- Kachkan
- Kaleh Ban
- Malekabad-e Somaq
- Sarzaman
- Seyyed Hasan Kalah Fathali
- Shahbaz Bek
- Valiabad-e Shiri
- Yar-e Hoseyn
