= Nargiz =

Nargiz may refer to:

- Nargeseh, also known as Nārgīz, a village in Dowreh Rural District, Chegeni District, Dowreh County, Lorestan Province, Iran
- Nargiz (opera), a 1935 opera by Muslim Magomayev
- Nargiz Aliyeva (born 2002), Azerbaijani women's footballer
- Nargiz Zakirova (born 1970), American-Uzbek singer
