= Gandabeh, Khorramabad =

Gandabeh, Khorramabad may refer to:

- Gandabeh, Azna
- Gandabeh, Robat
