= Khatereh =

Khatereh (also Khatira) is a Persian feminine given name meaning "memory" or "remembrance". Notable people with the name include:

== Given name ==
- Khatereh Asadi (born 1983), Iranian actress
- Khatira Bashirli (born 1958), Azerbaijani academic
- Khatereh Parvaneh (1930–2008), Iranian singer

== See also ==
- Khatereh, Dowreh, a village in Iran
