= Sarab-e Key Hatam =

Village in Lorestan province, Iran

Sarab-e Key Hatam Persian: سراب کي حاتم
- Village
- Location within Iran
- Coordinates: 33°33′57″N 48°08′34″E
- Country: Iran
- Province: Lorestan
- County: Chegeni
- District: Central
- Rural District: Dowreh

Population (2016)
  - Total: 135
- Time zone: UTC+3:30 (IRST)

Sarab-e Key Hatam (Persian: سَرابِ كِی ميرزاوَندبَك) (Note: Also romanized as Sarāb-e Key Hātam; formerly known as Sarab-e Key Mirzavandbak-e Yek (سراب کي ميرزاوند1), also romanized as Sarāb-e Key Mīrzāvandbak-e Yek; also known as Mīrzāvandekī, Sarāb-e Key Hātami, Sarab-e Key Mirzavandbak, and Sarāb-e Key Mīrzāvandbak) is a village in Dowreh Rural District of the Central District (Note: Formerly Chegeni District) in Chegeni County, (Note: Formerly Dowreh County) Lorestan province, Iran.

== Demographics ==
=== Population ===
At the time of the 2006 National Census, the village's population, as Sarab-e Key Mirzavandbak-e Yek, was 99 in 20 households, when it was in the former Dowreh-ye Chegeni District of Khorramabad County. The following census in 2011 counted 104 people in 30 households, by which time the district had been separated from the county in the establishment of Dowreh County. (Note: Renamed Chegeni County) The rural district was transferred to the new Chegeni District, (Note: Renamed the Central District) and the village was listed as Sarab-e Key Hatam. The 2016 census measured the population of the village as 135 people in 39 households.
