= Sarab-e Key Mirzavand-e Do =

Village in Lorestan province, Iran

Sarab-e Key Mirzavand-e Do Persian: سراب كي ميرزاونددو
- Village
- Location within Iran
- Coordinates: 33°33′56″N 48°08′36″E
- Country: Iran
- Province: Lorestan
- County: Chegeni
- District: Central
- Rural District: Dowreh

Population (2016)
  - Total: 143
- Time zone: UTC+3:30 (IRST)

Sarab-e Key Mirzavand-e Do (Persian: سراب كي ميرزاونددو) (Note: Also romanized as Sarab-e Key Mirzavand Du, Sarāb-e Key Mīrzāvand Dū, and Sarāb-e Key Mīrzāvand-e Do) is a village in Dowreh Rural District of the Central District (Note: Formerly Chegeni District) in Chegeni County, (Note: Formerly Dowreh County) Lorestan province, Iran.

== Demographics ==
=== Population ===
At the time of the 2006 National Census, the village's population was 289 in 76 households, when it was in the former Dowreh-ye Chegeni District of Khorramabad County. The following census in 2011 counted 134 people in 38 households, by which time the district had been separated from the county in the establishment of Dowreh County. (Note: Renamed Chegeni County) The rural district was transferred to the new Chegeni District. (Note: Renamed the Central District) The 2016 census measured the population of the village as 143 people in 40 households.
