= Meleh-ye Balut =

Village in Lorestan province, Iran

Meleh-ye Balut Persian: مله بلوط
- Village

- Location within Iran
- Coordinates: 33°38′14″N 47°56′49″E
- Country: Iran
- Province: Lorestan
- County: Chegeni
- District: Central
- Rural District: Dowreh

Population (2016)
  - Total: 424
- Time zone: UTC+3:30 (IRST)

Meleh-ye Balut (Persian: مله بلوط) (Note: Also romanized as Meleh-ye Balūţ; also known as Morād ʿAlī (مرادعلي)) is a village in Dowreh Rural District of the Central District (Note: Formerly Chegeni District) in Chegeni County, (Note: Formerly Dowreh County) Lorestan province, Iran.

== Demographics ==
=== Population ===
At the time of the 2006 National Census, the village's population was 409 in 90 households, when it was in the former Dowreh-ye Chegeni District of Khorramabad County. The following census in 2011 counted 382 people in 103 households, by which time the district had been separated from the county in the establishment of Dowreh County. (Note: Renamed Chegeni County) The rural district was transferred to the new Chegeni District. (Note: Renamed the Central District) The 2016 census measured the population of the village as 424 people in 122 households.
