= Koleh Hu, Lorestan =

Village in Lorestan province, Iran

Koleh Hu Persian: كله هو
- Village
- Location within Iran
- Coordinates: 33°39′53″N 47°48′40″E
- Country: Iran
- Province: Lorestan
- County: Chegeni
- District: Shahivand
- Rural District: Kashkan-e Jonubi

Population (2016)
  - Total: 1,107
- Time zone: UTC+3:30 (IRST)

Koleh Hu (Persian: كله هو) (Note: Also romanized as Koleh Hū; also known as Kalhū, Koleh Hū-ye Soflá, Kolehu, Kolehū, and Kolehū-ye Soflá) is a village in Kashkan-e Jonubi Rural District of Shahivand District in Chegeni County, (Note: Formerly Dowreh County) Lorestan province, Iran.

== Demographics ==
=== Population ===
At the time of the 2006 National Census, the village's population was 979 in 201 households, when it was in Kashkan Rural District (Note: Renamed Kashkan-e Shomali Rural District) of the former Dowreh-ye Chegeni District in Khorramabad County. The following census in 2011 counted 1,091 people in 243 households, by which time the district had been separated from the county in the establishment of Dowreh County. (Note: Renamed Chegeni County) The rural district was transferred to the new Shahivand District and renamed Kashkan-e Shomali Rural District. Koleh Hu was transferred to Kashkan-e Jonubi Rural District created in the same district. The 2016 census measured the population of the village as 1,107 people in 301 households, the most populous in its rural district.
