= Khatereh, Chegeni =

Village in Lorestan province, Iran

Khatereh Persian: خاطره
- Village
- Location within Iran
- Coordinates: 33°38′20″N 47°50′25″E
- Country: Iran
- Province: Lorestan
- County: Chegeni
- District: Shahivand
- Rural District: Kashkan-e Jonubi

Population (2016)
  - Total: 399
- Time zone: UTC+3:30 (IRST)

Khatereh (Persian: خاطره) (Note: Also romanized as Khāţereh; formerly known as Khātereh-ye Faraj) is a village in, and the capital of, Kashkan-e Jonubi Rural District in Shahivand District of Chegeni County, (Note: Formerly Dowreh County) Lorestan province, Iran.

== Demographics ==
=== Population ===
At the time of the 2006 National Census, the village's population was 844 in 193 households, when it was in Kashkan Rural District (Note: Renamed Kashkan-e Shomali Rural District) of the former Dowreh-ye Chegeni District in Khorramabad County. The following census in 2011 counted 498 people in 120 households, by which time the district had been separated from the county in the establishment of Dowreh County. (Note: Renamed Chegeni County) The rural district was transferred to the new Shahivand District and renamed Kashkan-e Shomali Rural District. Khatereh was transferred to Kashkan-e Jonubi Rural District created in the same district. The 2016 census measured the population of the village as 399 people in 147 households.
