= Charkhestaneh, Chegeni =

Village in Lorestan province, Iran

Charkhestaneh Persian: چرخستانه
- Village
- Location within Iran
- Coordinates: 33°36′55″N 47°50′51″E
- Country: Iran
- Province: Lorestan
- County: Chegeni
- District: Shahivand
- Rural District: Kashkan-e Jonubi

Population (2016)
  - Total: 158
- Time zone: UTC+3:30 (IRST)

Charkhestaneh (Persian: چرخستانه) (Note: Also romanized as Charkhestāneh; also known as Charkhestān) is a village in Kashkan-e Jonubi Rural District of Shahivand District in Chegeni County, (Note: Formerly Dowreh County) Lorestan province, Iran.

== Demographics ==
=== Population ===
At the time of the 2006 National Census, the village's population was 141 in 33 households, when it was in Kashkan Rural District (Note: Renamed Kashkan-e Shomali Rural District) of the former Dowreh-ye Chegeni District in Khorramabad County. The following census in 2011 counted 162 people in 38 households, by which time the district had been separated from the county in the establishment of Dowreh County. (Note: Renamed Chegeni County) The rural district was transferred to the new Shahivand District and renamed Kashkan-e Shomali Rural District. Charkhestaneh was transferred to Kashkan-e Jonubi Rural District created in the same district. The 2016 census measured the population of the village as 158 people in 49 households.
