= Morad Ali-ye Olya =

Morad Ali-ye Olya مرادعلي عليا
- Village
- Location within Iran
- Coordinates: 37°25′25″N 45°11′36″E
- Country: Iran
- Province: West Azerbaijan
- County: Urmia
- Bakhsh: Central
- Rural District: Torkaman

Population (2006)
  - Total: 175
- Time zone: UTC+3:30 (IRST)
  - Summer (DST): UTC+4:30 (IRDT)

Morad Ali-ye Olya (Persian: مرادعلي عليا, also Romanized as Morād ‘Alī-ye ‘Olyā and Morād‘Alī-ye ‘Olyā) is a village in Torkaman Rural District, in the Central District of Urmia County, West Azerbaijan Province, Iran. At the 2006 census, its population was 175, in 49 families.
