= Valiabad-e Deli Khomsir =

Valiabad-e Deli Khomsir ولي اباددلي خمسير
- Village
- Country: Iran
- Province: Kohgiluyeh and Boyer-Ahmad
- County: Dana
- Bakhsh: Kabgian
- Rural District: Kabgian

Population (2006)
  - Total: 140
- Time zone: UTC+3:30 (IRST)
  - Summer (DST): UTC+4:30 (IRDT)

Valiabad-e Deli Khomsir (Persian: ولي اباددلي خمسير, also Romanized as Valīābād-e Delī Khomsīr) is a village in Kabgian Rural District, Kabgian District, Dana County, Kohgiluyeh and Boyer-Ahmad Province, Iran. At the 2006 census, its population was 140, in 31 families.
