= Valiabad, Arzuiyeh =

Valiabad والي اباد
- Village
- Location within Iran
- Coordinates: 28°19′24″N 56°56′11″E
- Country: Iran
- Province: Kerman
- County: Arzuiyeh
- Bakhsh: Soghan
- Rural District: Soghan

Population (2006)
  - Total: 95
- Time zone: UTC+3:30 (IRST)
  - Summer (DST): UTC+4:30 (IRDT)

Valiabad (Persian: والي اباد, also Romanized as Vālīābād) is a village in Soghan Rural District, Soghan District, Arzuiyeh County, Kerman Province, Iran. At the 2006 census, its population was 95, in 22 families.
