= Morad Ali, Lorestan =

Morad Ali مرادعلي
- Village
- Location within Iran
- Coordinates: 33°23′20″N 47°02′12″E
- Country: Iran
- Province: Lorestan
- County: Kuhdasht
- Bakhsh: Kunani
- Rural District: Kunani

Population (2006)
  - Total: 370
- Time zone: UTC+3:30 (IRST)
  - Summer (DST): UTC+4:30 (IRDT)

Morad Ali (Persian: مرادعلي, also Romanized as Morād ‘Alī) is a village in Kunani Rural District, Kunani District, Kuhdasht County, Lorestan Province, Iran. At the 2006 census, its population was 370, in 73 families.
