= Dareshgaft, Khorramabad =

Dareshgaft دراشگفت
- Village
- Location within Iran
- Coordinates: 33°21′44″N 48°28′33″E
- Country: Iran
- Province: Lorestan
- County: Khorramabad
- Bakhsh: Central
- Rural District: Koregah-e Sharqi

Population (2006)
  - Total: 32
- Time zone: UTC+3:30 (IRST)
  - Summer (DST): UTC+4:30 (IRDT)

Dareshgaft (Persian: دراشگفت, also Romanized as Dareshkaft; also known as Nebār Kabūd, Benār Kabūd, and Benār Kabūd-e ‘Olyā) is a village in Koregah-e Sharqi Rural District, in the Central District of Khorramabad County, Lorestan Province, Iran. At the 2006 census, its population was 32, in 6 families.
