= Valiabad, Behbahan =

Valiabad ولي اباد
- Village
- Location within Iran
- Coordinates: 30°28′31″N 50°17′57″E
- Country: Iran
- Province: Khuzestan
- County: Behbahan
- Bakhsh: Central
- Rural District: Howmeh

Population (2006)
  - Total: 29
- Time zone: UTC+3:30 (IRST)
  - Summer (DST): UTC+4:30 (IRDT)

Valiabad (Persian: ولي اباد, also Romanized as Valīābād) is a village in Howmeh Rural District, in the Central District of Behbahan County, Khuzestan Province, Iran. At the 2006 census, its population was 29, in 6 families.
