= Valiabad, Kazerun =

Valiabad والي اباد
- Village
- Location within Iran
- Coordinates: 29°23′53″N 51°50′11″E
- Country: Iran
- Province: Fars
- County: Kazerun
- Bakhsh: Jereh and Baladeh
- Rural District: Jereh

Population (2016)
  - Total: 141
- Time zone: UTC+3:30 (IRST)
  - Summer (DST): UTC+4:30 (IRDT)

Valiabad (Persian: والي اباد, also Romanized as Vālīābād) is a village in Jereh Rural District, Jereh and Baladeh District, Kazerun County, Fars province, Iran. At the 2006 census, its population was 141, in 43 families.
