= Charkhestaneh, Azna =

Charkhestaneh چرخستانه
- Village
- Location within Iran
- Coordinates: 33°20′14″N 49°27′53″E
- Country: Iran
- Province: Lorestan
- County: Azna
- Bakhsh: Central
- Rural District: Pachehlak-e Gharbi

Population (2006)
  - Total: 143
- Time zone: UTC+3:30 (IRST)
  - Summer (DST): UTC+4:30 (IRDT)

Charkhestaneh (Persian: چرخستانه, also Romanized as Charkhestāneh; also known as Charkhtaneh (Persian: چرختانه), also Romanized as Charkhtāneh) is a village in Pachehlak-e Gharbi Rural District, in the Central District of Azna County, Lorestan Province, Iran. At the 2006 census, its population was 143, in 28 families.
