= Kolah Hu, Kermanshah =

Kolah Hu كله هو
- Village
- Location within Iran
- Coordinates: 34°09′05″N 47°22′30″E
- Country: Iran
- Province: Kermanshah
- County: Kermanshah
- Bakhsh: Central
- Rural District: Qarah Su

Population (2006)
  - Total: 471
- Time zone: UTC+3:30 (IRST)
  - Summer (DST): UTC+4:30 (IRDT)

Kolah Hu (Persian: كله هو, also Romanized as Kolah Hū) is a village in Qarah Su Rural District, in the Central District of Kermanshah County, Kermanshah Province, Iran. At the 2006 census, its population was 471, in 82 families.
