= Charkhestaneh, Khorramabad =

Charkhestaneh چرخستانه
- Village
- Location within Iran
- Coordinates: 33°37′33″N 48°37′26″E
- Country: Iran
- Province: Lorestan
- County: Khorramabad
- Bakhsh: Bayravand
- Rural District: Beyranvand-e Jonubi

Population (2006)
  - Total: 117
- Time zone: UTC+3:30 (IRST)
  - Summer (DST): UTC+4:30 (IRDT)

Charkhestaneh (Persian: چرخستانه, also Romanized as Charkhestāneh; also known as Chār Sāna, Chār Sūna, and Chowkhestāneh) is a village in Beyranvand-e Jonubi Rural District, Bayravand District, Khorramabad County, Lorestan Province, Iran. At the 2006 census, its population was 117, in 30 families.
