= Dowreh Rural District =

Rural district in Lorestan province, Iran

Dowreh Rural District Persian: دهستان دوره
- Rural District
- Meleh-ya-balut

- Location within Iran
- Coordinates: 33°36′N 48°05′E
- Country: Iran
- Province: Lorestan
- County: Chegeni
- District: Central
- Established: 1987
- Capital: Sarab-e Dowreh

Population (2016)
  - Total: 8,907
- Time zone: UTC+3:30 (IRST)

Dowreh Rural District (Persian: دهستان دوره) is in the Central District (Note: Formerly Chegeni District) of Chegeni County, (Note: Formerly Dowreh County) Lorestan province, Iran. It is administered from the city of Sarab-e Dowreh.

== Demographics ==
=== Population ===
At the time of the 2006 National Census, the rural district's population (as a part of the former Dowreh-ye Chegeni District in Khorramabad County) was 9,208 in 2,052 households. There were 9,444 inhabitants in 2,349 households at the following census of 2011, by which time the district had been separated from the county in the establishment of Dowreh County. (Note: Renamed Chegeni County) The rural district was transferred to the new Chegeni District. (Note: Renamed the Central District) The 2016 census measured the population of the rural district as 8,907 in 2,484 households. The most populous of its 45 villages was Sarab-e Naveh Kesh, with 983 people.

=== Other villages in the rural district ===
- Berekeh
- Bozab
- Chah Cheragh
- Chahar Meleh Gel Sorkheh
- Cham Chareh-ye Do
- Cham Chareh-ye Seh
- Chenar-e Mishakhvor
- Darb
- Darreh Saki
- Darreh-ye Badam
- Gandabeh
- Golzar
- Harrafteh
- Hoseyvand
- Koleh Ney
- Lareh Sabzi
- Meleh-ye Amiri
- Meleh-ye Balut
- Meleh-ye Shabanan
- Mishkar
- Nargeseh
- Pakdasht
- Rahimabad-e Do
- Rahimabad-e Seh
- Rahimabad-e Yek
- Rikhan
- Sarab-e Cheggeh
- Sarab-e Key Gar-e Sheykhan-e Do
- Sarab-e Key Gar-e Sheykhan-e Yek
- Sarab-e Key Hatam
- Sarab-e Key Mirzavand-e Do
- Sefid Ab
- Seh Korreh
- Shurabad
- Zarrin-e Chaqa
