= Morad Ali, Hirmand =

Morad Ali مرادعلي
- Village
- Location within Iran
- Coordinates: 31°08′41″N 61°42′18″E
- Country: Iran
- Province: Sistan and Baluchestan
- County: Hirmand
- Bakhsh: Central
- Rural District: Margan

Population (2006)
  - Total: 67
- Time zone: UTC+3:30 (IRST)
  - Summer (DST): UTC+4:30 (IRDT)

Morad Ali (Persian: مرادعلي, also Romanized as Morād ‘Alī) is a village in Margan Rural District, in the Central District of Hirmand County, Sistan and Baluchestan Province, Iran. At the 2006 census, its population was 67, in 14 families.
