= Valiabad, Fasa =

Valiabad ولي اباد
- Village
- Location within Iran
- Coordinates: 29°11′52″N 53°28′24″E
- Country: Iran
- Province: Fars
- County: Fasa
- Bakhsh: Central
- Rural District: Jangal

Population (2006)
  - Total: 31
- Time zone: UTC+3:30 (IRST)
  - Summer (DST): UTC+4:30 (IRDT)

Valiabad (Persian: ولي اباد, also Romanized as Valīābād) is a village in Jangal Rural District, in the Central District of Fasa County, Fars province, Iran. At the 2006 census, its population was 31, in 8 families.

== See also ==
- List of cities, towns and villages in Fars province
