= Chah Cheragh, Kerman =

Chah Cheragh چاه چراغ
- Village
- Country: Iran
- Province: Kerman
- County: Rigan
- Bakhsh: Central
- Rural District: Gavkan

Population (2006)
  - Total: 42
- Time zone: UTC+3:30 (IRST)
  - Summer (DST): UTC+4:30 (IRDT)

Chah Cheragh (Persian: چاه چراغ, also Romanized as Chāh Cherāgh) is a village in Gavkan Rural District, in the Central District of Rigan County, Kerman Province, Iran. At the 2006 census, its population was 42, in 9 families.
