= Chareh, West Azerbaijan =

Chareh چره
- Village
- Location within Iran
- Coordinates: 37°43′49″N 44°45′25″E
- Country: Iran
- Province: West Azerbaijan
- County: Urmia
- Bakhsh: Sumay-ye Beradust
- Rural District: Beradust

Population (2006)
  - Total: 137
- Time zone: UTC+3:30 (IRST)
  - Summer (DST): UTC+4:30 (IRDT)

Chareh (Persian: چره, also Romanized as Chereh; also known as Chehreh and Chīreh) is a village in Beradust Rural District, Sumay-ye Beradust District, Urmia County, West Azerbaijan Province, Iran. At the 2006 census, its population was 137, in 17 families.
