= Morad Ali-ye Sofla =

Morad Ali-ye Sofla مرادعلي سفلي
- Village
- Location within Iran
- Coordinates: 37°25′36″N 45°12′00″E
- Country: Iran
- Province: West Azerbaijan
- County: Urmia
- Bakhsh: Central
- Rural District: Torkaman

Population (2006)
  - Total: 143
- Time zone: UTC+3:30 (IRST)
  - Summer (DST): UTC+4:30 (IRDT)

Morad Ali-ye Sofla (Persian: مرادعلي سفلي, also Romanized as Morād ‘Alī-ye Soflá and Morād‘Alī-ye Soflá) is a village in Torkaman Rural District, in the Central District of Urmia County, West Azerbaijan Province, Iran. At the 2006 census, its population was 143, in 42 families.
