= Valiabad, South Khorasan =

Valiabad ولي اباد
- Village
- Location within Iran
- Coordinates: 33°30′00″N 60°02′00″E
- Country: Iran
- Province: South Khorasan
- County: Zirkuh
- Bakhsh: Central
- Rural District: Zirkuh

Population (2006)
  - Total: 76
- Time zone: UTC+3:30 (IRST)
  - Summer (DST): UTC+4:30 (IRDT)

Valiabad (Persian: ولي اباد, also Romanized as Valīābād) is a village in Zirkuh Rural District, Central District, Zirkuh County, South Khorasan Province, Iran. At the 2006 census, its population was 76, in 18 families.
