= Chareh, Khuzestan =

Chareh چاره
- Village
- Location within Iran
- Coordinates: 32°53′00″N 48°17′00″E
- Country: Iran
- Province: Khuzestan
- County: Andimeshk
- Bakhsh: Alvar-e Garmsiri
- Rural District: Qilab

Population (2006)
  - Total: 38
- Time zone: UTC+3:30 (IRST)
  - Summer (DST): UTC+4:30 (IRDT)

Chareh (Persian: چاره, also Romanized as Chāreh) is a village in Qilab Rural District, Alvar-e Garmsiri District, Andimeshk County, Khuzestan Province, Iran. At the 2006 census, its population was 38, in 8 families.
