= Sarab-e Dowreh =

City in Lorestan province, Iran

Sarab-e Dowreh Persian: سراب دوره
- City
- Location within Iran
- Coordinates: 33°33′49″N 48°01′21″E
- Country: Iran
- Province: Lorestan
- County: Chegeni
- District: Central
- Established as a city: 1996

Population (2016)
  - Total: 1,713
- Time zone: UTC+3:30 (IRST)

Sarab-e Dowreh (Persian: سراب دوره) (Note: Also romanized as Sarāb Dowrah, Sarāb Dowreh, Sarāb-e Do Rah, and Sarāb-e Dowreh; also known as Sarāb Darreh and Sarāb Doreh) is a city in the Central District (Note: Formerly Chegeni District) of Chegeni County, (Note: Formerly Dowreh County) Lorestan province, Iran, serving as capital of both the county and the district. It is also the administrative center for Dowreh Rural District. The village of Sarab-e Dowreh was converted to a city in 1996.

== Demographics ==
=== Population ===
At the time of the 2006 National Census, the city's population was 1,312 in 326 households, when it was capital of the former Dowreh-ye Chegeni District in Khorramabad County. The following census in 2011 counted 1,515 people in 368 households, by which time the district had been separated from the county in the establishment of Dowreh County. (Note: Renamed Chegeni County) Sarab-e Dowreh was transferred to the new Chegeni District (Note: Renamed the Central District) as the county's capital. The 2016 census measured the population of the city as 1,713 people in 478 households.
