= Valiabad, Lorestan =

Valiabad ولي اباد
- Village
- Location within Iran
- Coordinates: 33°51′09″N 48°17′11″E
- Country: Iran
- Province: Lorestan
- County: Selseleh
- Bakhsh: Central
- Rural District: Qaleh-ye Mozaffari

Population (2006)
  - Total: 73
- Time zone: UTC+3:30 (IRST)
  - Summer (DST): UTC+4:30 (IRDT)

Valiabad (Persian: ولي اباد, also Romanized as Valīābād) is a village in Qaleh-ye Mozaffari Rural District, in the Central District of Selseleh County, Lorestan Province, Iran. At the 2006 census, its population was 73, in 14 families.
