= Gandabeh, Azna =

Gandabeh گندابه
- Village
- Location within Iran
- Coordinates: 33°25′11″N 48°33′15″E
- Country: Iran
- Province: Lorestan
- County: Khorramabad
- Bakhsh: Central
- Rural District: Azna

Population (2006)
  - Total: 56
- Time zone: UTC+3:30 (IRST)
  - Summer (DST): UTC+4:30 (IRDT)

Gandabeh (Persian: گندابه, also Romanized as Gandābeh and Gandāveh; also known as Gandābeh Ḩoseynābād and Hoseynābād) is a village in Azna Rural District, in the Central District of Khorramabad County, Lorestan Province, Iran. At the 2006 census, its population was 56, in 12 families.
