= Teshkan Rural District =

Rural district in Lorestan province, Iran

Teshkan Rural District Persian: دهستان تشكن
- Rural District
- Location within Iran
- Coordinates: 33°38′43″N 47°53′21″E
- Country: Iran
- Province: Lorestan
- County: Chegeni
- District: Central
- Established: 1987
- Capital: Chah-e Zu ol Faqar

Population (2016)
  - Total: 5,004
- Time zone: UTC+3:30 (IRST)

Teshkan Rural District (Persian: دهستان تشكن) is in the Central District (Note: Formerly Chegeni District) of Chegeni County, (Note: Formerly Dowreh County) Lorestan province, Iran. Its capital is the village of Chah-e Zu ol Faqar.

== Demographics ==
=== Population ===
At the time of the 2006 National Census, the rural district's population (as a part of the former Dowreh-ye Chegeni District in Khorramabad County) was 10,303 in 2,154 households. There were 5,231 inhabitants in 1,298 households at the following census of 2011, by which time the district had been separated from the county in the establishment of Dowreh County. (Note: Renamed Chegeni County) The rural district was transferred to the new Chegeni District. (Note: Renamed the Central District) The 2016 census measured the population of the rural district as 5,004 in 1,384 households. The most populous of its 27 villages was Chah-e Zu ol Faqar, with 492 people.

=== Other villages in the rural district ===
- Amirabad
- Bon Mazraeh
- Darreh
- Eslamabad
- Hezar Mani
- Keryeh-ye Do
- Keryeh-ye Seh
- Keryeh-ye Yek
- Key Bar Aftab
- Kheyrabad-e Bala
- Kheyrabad-e Pain
- Moradabad
- Nur Mohammad Khan
- Panesar-e Tashkan
- Pir Shams ol Din
- Qaleh-ye Bahador
- Qasemali-ye Bar Aftab
- Sadat-e Tashkan
- Sarab
- Saranbar-e Kalantari
- Saranbar-e Sadat va Nosrati
- Taftafineh Shams Ali
- Tulabi
