= Central District (Chegeni County) =

District in Lorestan province, Iran

Central District (Chegeni County) Persian: بخش مرکزی شهرستان چگنی
- District
- Meleh-ya-balut

- Location within Iran
- Coordinates: 33°37′N 48°02′E
- Country: Iran
- Province: Lorestan
- County: Chegeni
- Established as Chegeni District: 2007
- Capital: Sarab-e Dowreh

Population (2011)
  - Total: 16,190
- Time zone: UTC+3:30 (IRST)

The Central District of Chegeni County (Note: Formerly Dowreh County) (Persian: بخش مرکزی شهرستان چگنی) (Note: Formerly Chegeni District (بخش چگنی)) is in Lorestan province, Iran. Its capital is the city of Sarab-e Dowreh.

== History ==
In 2007, Dowreh-ye Chegeni and Veysian Districts were separated from Khorramabad County in the establishment of Dowreh County, (Note: Renamed Chegeni County in 2019) which was divided into three districts of two rural districts each, with Sarab-e Dowreh as its capital. The county was renamed Chegeni County in 2019, and Chegeni District was renamed the Central District in 2023.

== Demographics ==
=== Population ===
At the time of the 2011 National Census, the district's population was 16,190 people in 4,015 households. The 2016 census measured the population of the district as 15,624 inhabitants in 4,346 households.

=== Administrative divisions ===
Central District Population
Administrative Divisions	2011	2016
Dowreh RD	9,444	8,907
Teshkan RD	5,231	5,004
Sarab-e Dowreh (city)	1,515	1,713
Total	16,190	15,624
RD = Rural District
