= Chegeni County =

County in Lorestan province, Iran

Chegeni County Persian: شهرستان چگنی
- County
- Meleh-ya-balut

- Location of Chegeni County in Lorestan province (center left, green)

- Location of Lorestan province in Iran
- Coordinates: 33°36′N 47°56′E
- Country: Iran
- Province: Lorestan
- Established as Dowreh County: 2007
- Capital: Sarab-e Dowreh
- Districts: Central, Shahivand, Veysian

Population (2016)
  - Total: 41,756
- Time zone: UTC+3:30 (IRST)

Chegeni County (Persian: شهرستان چگنی) (Note: Formerly Dowreh County (شهرستان دوره)) is in Lorestan province, Iran. Its capital is the city of Sarab-e Dowreh.

== History ==
In 2007, Dowreh-ye Chegeni and Veysian Districts were separated from Khorramabad County in the establishment of Dowreh County, (Note: Renamed Chegeni County in 2019) which was divided into three districts of two rural districts each, with Sarab-e Dowreh as its capital. The county was renamed Chegeni County in 2019.

== Demographics ==
=== Population ===
At the time of the 2011 National Census, the county's population was 43,221 people in 10,819 households. The 2016 census measured the population of the county as 41,756 in 11,948 households.

=== Administrative divisions ===
Chegeni County's population history and administrative structure over two consecutive censuses are shown in the following table.

Chegeni County Population
Administrative Divisions	2011	2016
Central District (Note: Formerly Chegeni District)	16,190	15,624
Dowreh RD	9,444	8,907
Teshkan RD	5,231	5,004
Sarab-e Dowreh (city)	1,515	1,713
Shahivand District	14,824	14,851
Kashkan-e Jonubi RD	6,496	6,379
Kashkan-e Shomali RD (Note: Formerly Kashkan Rural District)	8,328	8,472
Veysian District	12,198	11,281
Shurab RD	4,413	4,251
Veysian RD	5,797	4,943
Veysian (city) (Note: Formerly Mahmudvand)	1,988	2,087
Total	43,221	41,756
RD = Rural District

== See also ==
Media related to Chegeni County at Wikimedia Commons
