= Shurab =

Shurab or Shur Ab (Persian: شوراب) may refer to:

== Afghanistan ==
- Shurab, Afghanistan

== Iran ==
=== Chaharmahal and Bakhtiari Province ===
- Shur Ab, Chaharmahal and Bakhtiari, a village in Lordegan County
- Shurab-e Kabir, a village in Shahrekord County
- Shurab-e Saghir, a village in Shahrekord County
- Shurab-e Tangazi Rural District

=== Fars Province ===
- Shurab, Arsanjan, a village in Arsanjan County
- Shurab Rural District (Fars Province), in Arsanjan County
- Shurab-e Lor, a village in Mamasani County
- Shurab-e Tork, a village in Mamasani County
- Shurab-e Zar, a village in Mamasani County
- Shur Ab, Shiraz, a village in Shiraz County

=== Ilam Province ===
- Shurab-e Khan Ali, a village in Shirvan and Chardaval County

=== Isfahan Province ===
- Shurab, Isfahan, a village in Kashan County

=== Kerman Province ===
- Shur Ab, Jiroft, a village in Jiroft County
- Shurab, Rigan, a village in Rigan County
- Shurab, Rudbar-e Jonubi, a village in Rudbar-e Jonubi County

=== Kurdistan Province ===
- Shurab-e Hajji, a village in Qorveh County
- Shur Ab-e Hezareh, a village in Qorveh County
- Shurab Khan, a village in Qorveh County

=== Lorestan Province ===
- Shurab-e Mahmudvand, a village in Dowreh County
- Shurab-e Najm-e Soheyli, a village in Dowreh County
- Shurab-e Olya, Lorestan, a village in Dowreh County
- Shurab Rural District (Lorestan Province), Iran

=== Mazandaran Province ===
- Shur Ab, Mazandaran, a village in Savadkuh County
- Shur Ab, Neka, a village in Neka County

=== Qazvin Province ===
- Shur Ab, Qazvin, a village in Buin Zahra County

=== Qom Province ===
- Shurab, Qom, a village in Qom County

=== Razavi Khorasan Province ===
- Shurab-e Olya, Fariman, a village in Fariman County
- Shurab-e Sofla, a village in Fariman County
- Shurab, Firuzeh, a village in Firuzeh County
- Shuryab, a village in Firuzeh County
- Shurab, Gonabad, a village in Gonabad County
- Shur Ab, Khalilabad, a village in Khalilabad County
- Shurab, Tus, a village in Mashhad County
- Shur Ab-e Olya, Sarakhs, a village in Sarakhs County
- Shur Ab-e Sofla, a village in Sarakhs County
- Shur Ab-e Vosta, a village in Sarakhs County
- Shurab, Torbat-e Jam, a village in Torbat-e Jam County
- Shurab-e Jahan, a village in Torbat-e Jam County
- Shurab-e Olya, Torbat-e Jam, a village in Torbat-e Jam County
- Shurab, Zaveh, a village in Zaveh County

=== Sistan and Baluchestan Province ===
- Shurab, Sistan and Baluchestan, a village in Iranshahr County

=== South Khorasan Province ===
- Shur Ab, Birjand, a village in Birjand County

=== West Azerbaijan Province ===
- Shur Ab, West Azerbaijan, a village in Khoy County

=== Zanjan Province ===
- Shur Ab, Ijrud, a village in Ijrud County
- Shur Ab, Khodabandeh, a village in Khodabandeh County
- Shur Ab, Tarom, a village in Tarom County

== Tajikistan ==
- Shurab, Tajikistan
