= Karfaleh =

Karfaleh or Karfeleh or Kerfeleh or Karfelah (Persian: كرفله) may refer to:

- Karfelah, Kermanshah
- Karfaleh, Lorestan
- Karfaleh-ye Lavan, Lorestan Province
- Karfeleh-ye Imanabad, Lorestan Province
