= Mahmudvand =

Mahmudvand (Persian: محمودوند) may refer to:

- Mahmudvand, Hamadan, a village
- Mahmudvand, Lorestan, a village
- Shurab-e Mahmudvand, a village
- Veysian, a city
