= Shurab-e Olya =

Shurab-e Olya (Persian: شوراب عليا) or Shurab-e Bala (Persian: شوراب بالا) or Shur Ab-e Olya, all meaning "Upper Shurab", may refer to:

- Shurab-e Bala, Fars
- Shurab-e Olya, Lorestan
- Shurab-e Olya, Fariman, Razavi Khorasan Province
- Shur Ab-e Olya, Sarakhs, Razavi Khorasan Province
- Shurab-e Olya, Torbat-e Jam, Razavi Khorasan Province
