= Cham Bagh (disambiguation) =

Cham Bagh is a village in Lorestan Province, Iran.

Cham Bagh (Persian: چم باغ) may also refer to:

- Cham Bagh-e Sofla, a village in Iran
- Cham Bagh-e Veysian or Veysian, a village in Iran
