= Gholaman (disambiguation) =

Gholaman may refer to:

- Gholaman Rural District, in Raz and Jargalan District, Bojnord County, North Khorasan Province, Iran
  - Gholaman, a village in Gholaman Rural District
- Gholaman-e Olya, a village in Dowreh County, Lorestan Province, Iran
- Gholaman-e Sofla, a village in Dowreh County, Lorestan Province, Iran

== See also ==
- Dahan-e Gholaman, an archeological site in eastern Iran
- Deh Gholaman, a village in Badakhshan Province, Afghanistan
- Now Bahar-e Gholaman, a village in Bakharz County, Razavi Khorasan Province, Iran
- Gulaman, dried agar used in Filipino cuisine
