= Kaduney =

Kaduney (Persian: كادوني) may refer to:

- Kaduney-e Olya
- Kaduney-e Sofla
- Kaduney-e Vosta
