= Farzali =

Farzali may refer to:

- Fərzalı, Azerbaijan
- Fərzili, Azerbaijan
- Farzali, Iran
