= Kalateh-ye Aqa Mohammad =

Kalateh-ye Aqa Mohammad كلاته اقامحمد
- Village
- Location within Iran
- Coordinates: 35°25′57″N 60°05′18″E
- Country: Iran
- Province: Razavi Khorasan
- County: Torbat-e Jam
- Bakhsh: Nasrabad
- Rural District: Karizan

Population (2006)
  - Total: 174
- Time zone: UTC+3:30 (IRST)
  - Summer (DST): UTC+4:30 (IRDT)

Kalateh-ye Aqa Mohammad (Persian: كلاته اقامحمد, also Romanized as Kalāteh-ye Āqā Moḩammad) is a village in Karizan Rural District, Nasrabad District, Torbat-e Jam County, Razavi Khorasan Province, Iran. At the 2006 census, its population was 174, in 35 families.
