= Karizan =

Karizan (Persian: كاريزان) may refer to:

- Karizan, Razavi Khorasan
- Karizan Rural District, in Razavi Khorasan Province
