= Khuk Ab =

Khuk Ab خوك اب
- Village
- Location within Iran
- Coordinates: 35°27′53″N 60°01′58″E
- Country: Iran
- Province: Razavi Khorasan
- County: Torbat-e Jam
- Bakhsh: Nasrabad
- Rural District: Karizan

Population (2006)
  - Total: 33
- Time zone: UTC+3:30 (IRST)
  - Summer (DST): UTC+4:30 (IRDT)

Khuk Ab (Persian: خوك اب, also Romanized as Khūk Āb; also known as Qand Āb) is a village in Karizan Rural District, Nasrabad District, Torbat-e Jam County, Razavi Khorasan Province, Iran. At the 2006 census, its population was 33, in 8 families.
