= Pireh Sorkh =

Pireh Sorkh (Persian: پيره سرخ), also known as Pir Sorkh or Pir-i-Surkh, may refer to:

- Pireh Sorkh-e Bala
- Pireh Sorkh-e Pain
