= Shurab-e Pain =

Shurab-e Pain (Persian: شوراب پائین) may refer to:

- Shurab-e Pain, Fars
- Shurab-e Pain, Fariman, Razavi Khorasan Province
- Shurab-e Pain, Sarakhs, Razavi Khorasan Province
