= Qalebi =

Qalebi (Persian: قالبي) may refer to:

- Qalebi-ye Olya
- Qalebi-ye Sofla
