= Hasanak =

Hasanak (Persian: حسنك) may refer to:

- Hasanak the Vizier (c. 995-1032), a vizier of the Persian Empire
- Hasanak, Razavi Khorasan, a village in Razavi Khorasan Province, Iran
- Hasanak, alternate name of Hasanabad, Nasrabad, Razavi Khorasan Province, Iran
