= Dimah Mil =

Dimah Mil or Dimeh Mil (Persian: ديمه ميل) may refer to:

- Dimah Mil Olya
- Dimah Mil Sofla
