= Anday =

Anday انداي
- Village
- Location within Iran
- Coordinates: 35°28′36″N 60°09′51″E
- Country: Iran
- Province: Razavi Khorasan
- County: Torbat-e Jam
- Bakhsh: Nasrabad
- Rural District: Karizan

Population (2006)
  - Total: 110
- Time zone: UTC+3:30 (IRST)
  - Summer (DST): UTC+4:30 (IRDT)

Anday (Persian: انداي, also Romanized as Andāy) is a village in Karizan Rural District, Nasrabad District, Torbat-e Jam County, Razavi Khorasan Province, Iran. At the 2006 census, its population was 110, in 31 families.

== See also ==
- List of cities, towns and villages in Razavi Khorasan Province
