= Zavader-e Olya =

Zavader-e Olya زوادرعليا
- Village
- Location within Iran
- Coordinates: 35°20′37″N 60°13′23″E
- Country: Iran
- Province: Razavi Khorasan
- County: Torbat-e Jam
- Bakhsh: Nasrabad
- Rural District: Bala Jam

Population (2006)
  - Total: 93
- Time zone: UTC+3:30 (IRST)
  - Summer (DST): UTC+4:30 (IRDT)

Zavader-e Olya (Persian: زوادرعليا, also Romanized as Zavāder-e ‘Olyā; also known as Zavāder) is a village in Bala Jam Rural District, Nasrabad District, Torbat-e Jam County, Razavi Khorasan Province, Iran. At the 2006 census, its population was 93, in 22 families.
