= Somaqcheh =

Somaqcheh سماقچه
- Village
- Location within Iran
- Coordinates: 35°27′59″N 60°03′22″E
- Country: Iran
- Province: Razavi Khorasan
- County: Torbat-e Jam
- Bakhsh: Nasrabad
- Rural District: Karizan

Population (2006)
  - Total: 100
- Time zone: UTC+3:30 (IRST)
  - Summer (DST): UTC+4:30 (IRDT)

Somaqcheh (Persian: سماقچه, also Romanized as Somāqcheh; also known as Sāqcheh) is a village in Karizan Rural District, Nasrabad District, Torbat-e Jam County, Razavi Khorasan Province, Iran. At the 2006 census, its population was 100, in 26 families.
