= Somsara =

Somsara (Persian: سمسراي) may refer to:

- Somsara-ye Olya
- Somsara-ye Sofla

== Other uses ==
- Somsara (fine jewelry brand), a New York City–based fine jewelry brand focused on modular, interchangeable, and kinetic jewelry using traditional materials and gemstones
