= Samangan, Torbat-e Jam =

Village in Razavi Khorasan province, Iran

Samangan Persian: سمنگان
- Village
- Location within Iran
- Coordinates: 35°31′46″N 60°14′07″E
- Country: Iran
- Province: Razavi Khorasan
- County: Torbat-e Jam
- District: Nasrabad
- Rural District: Karizan

Population (2016)
  - Total: 6,299
- Time zone: UTC+3:30 (IRST)

Samangan (Persian: سمنگان) (Note: Also romanized as Samangān; also known as Ribāt-i-Samangan, Robāţ-e Samangān (رباط سمنگان), and Robāt-e Samgān) is a village in Karizan Rural District of Nasrabad District in Torbat-e Jam County, Razavi Khorasan province, Iran.

== Demographics ==
=== Population ===
At the time of the 2006 National Census, the village's population was 5,173 in 1,136 households. The following census in 2011 counted 5,898 people in 1,508 households. The 2016 census measured the population of the village as 6,299 people in 1,652 households. It was the most populous village in its rural district.
