= Abuzar =

Village in Lorestan province, Iran

Abuzar Persian: ابوذر
- Village
- Location within Iran
- Country: Iran
- Province: Lorestan
- County: Chegeni
- District: Veysian
- Rural District: Veysian

Population (2016)
  - Total: 111
- Time zone: UTC+3:30 (IRST)

Abuzar (Persian: ابوذر) (Note: Also romanized as Abūz̄ar) is a village in Veysian Rural District of Veysian District in Chegeni County, (Note: Formerly Dowreh County) Lorestan province, Iran.

== Demographics ==
=== Population ===
At the time of the 2006 National Census, the village's population was 112 in 27 households, when it was in Khorramabad County. The following census in 2011 counted 212 people in 31 households, by which time the district had been separated from the county in the establishment of Dowreh County. (Note: Renamed Chegeni County) The 2016 census measured the population of the village as 111 people in 38 households.
