= Zircheshmeh =

Village in Lorestan province, Iran

Zircheshmeh Persian: زيرچشمه
- Village
- Location within Iran
- Coordinates: 33°28′22″N 48°09′46″E
- Country: Iran
- Province: Lorestan
- County: Chegeni
- District: Veysian
- Rural District: Shurab

Population (2016)
  - Total: 98
- Time zone: UTC+3:30 (IRST)

Zircheshmeh (Persian: زيرچشمه) (Note: Also romanized as Zīrcheshmeh) is a village in Shurab Rural District of Veysian District in Chegeni County, (Note: Formerly Dowreh County) Lorestan province, Iran.

== Demographics ==
=== Population ===
At the time of the 2006 National Census, the village's population was 126 in 26 households, when it was in Khorramabad County. The following census in 2011 counted 114 people in 24 households, by which time the district had been separated from the county in the establishment of Dowreh County. (Note: Renamed Chegeni County) The 2016 census measured the population of the village as 98 people in 26 households.
