= Sabzevar (disambiguation) =

Sabzevar is a city in Razavi Khorasan Province, Iran.

Sabzevar (Persian: سبزوار) may also refer to:

- Sabzevar, Lorestan, a village in Lorestan Province, Iran
- Sabzevar County, an administrative subdivision of Iran
- Shindand, formerly known as Sabzevar

== See also ==
- Sabzwari dynasty, aristocratic family in Mughal India
