= Zurandul =

Village in Lorestan province, Iran

Zurandul Persian: زوراندول
- Village
- Location within Iran
- Coordinates: 33°29′22″N 47°59′25″E
- Country: Iran
- Province: Lorestan
- County: Chegeni
- District: Veysian
- Rural District: Veysian

Population (2016)
  - Total: 165
- Time zone: UTC+3:30 (IRST)

Zurandul (Persian: زوراندول) (Note: Also romanized as Zūrāndūl) is a village in Veysian Rural District of Veysian District in Chegeni County, (Note: Formerly Dowreh County) Lorestan province, Iran.

== Demographics ==
=== Population ===
At the time of the 2006 National Census, the village's population was 229 in 60 households, when it was in Khorramabad County. The following census in 2011 counted 223 people in 72 households, by which time the district had been separated from the county in the establishment of Dowreh County. (Note: Renamed Chegeni County) The 2016 census measured the population of the village as 165 people in 60 households.
