= Mineh =

Village in Lorestan province, Iran

Mineh Persian: مينه
- Village
- Location within Iran
- Coordinates: 33°23′59″N 48°07′28″E
- Country: Iran
- Province: Lorestan
- County: Chegeni
- District: Veysian
- Rural District: Shurab

Population (2016)
  - Total: 371
- Time zone: UTC+3:30 (IRST)

Mineh (Persian: مينه) (Note: Also romanized as Mīneh; also known as Mīnā and Mīneh-ye Soflá) is a village in Shurab Rural District of Veysian District in Chegeni County, (Note: Formerly Dowreh County) Lorestan province, Iran.

== Demographics ==
=== Population ===
At the time of the 2006 National Census, the village's population was 429 in 81 households, when it was in Khorramabad County. The following census in 2011 counted 324 people in 91 households, by which time the district had been separated from the county in the establishment of Dowreh County. (Note: Renamed Chegeni County) The 2016 census measured the population of the village as 371 people in 108 households, the most populous in its rural district.
