= Shurab-e Jahan =

Village in Bala Jam Rural District

Shurab-e Jahan شوراب جهان
- Village
- Location within Iran
- Coordinates: 35°20′44″N 60°19′33″E
- Country: Iran
- Province: Razavi Khorasan
- County: Torbat-e Jam
- Bakhsh: Nasrabad
- Rural District: Bala Jam

Population (2006)
  - Total: 83
- Time zone: UTC+3:30 (IRST)
  - Summer (DST): UTC+4:30 (IRDT)

Shurab-e Jahan (Persian: شوراب جهان, also Romanized as Shūrāb-e Jahān; also known as Shūrāb and Shūrāb-e Soflá) is a village in Bala Jam Rural District, Nasrabad District, Torbat-e Jam County, Razavi Khorasan Province, Iran. At the 2006 census, its population was 83, in 16 families.
