= Nushad Golaban =

Nushad Golaban (Persian: نوشادگل ابان) may refer to:

- Nushad Golaban 1
- Nushad Golaban 2
