= Barikeh =

Village in Lorestan province, Iran

Barikeh Persian: باريكه
- Village
- Location within Iran
- Coordinates: 33°27′56″N 47°53′38″E
- Country: Iran
- Province: Lorestan
- County: Chegeni
- District: Veysian
- Rural District: Veysian

Population (2016)
  - Total: 31
- Time zone: UTC+3:30 (IRST)

Barikeh (Persian: باريكه) (Note: Also romanized as Bārīkeh; also known as Bārīkeh-ye Kālīāb) is a village in Veysian Rural District of Veysian District in Chegeni County, (Note: Formerly Dowreh County) Lorestan province, Iran.

== Demographics ==
=== Population ===
At the time of the 2006 National Census, the village's population was 28 in seven households, when it was in Khorramabad County. The following census in 2011 counted 25 people in nine households, by which time the district had been separated from the county in the establishment of Dowreh County. (Note: Renamed Chegeni County) The 2016 census measured the population of the village as 31 people in nine households.
