= Bid Khal =

Bid Khal بيدخل
- Village
- Location within Iran
- Coordinates: 30°12′28″N 51°11′11″E
- Country: Iran
- Province: Fars
- County: Mamasani
- Bakhsh: Central
- Rural District: Bakesh-e Do

Population (2006)
  - Total: 115
- Time zone: UTC+3:30 (IRST)
  - Summer (DST): UTC+4:30 (IRDT)

Bid Khal (Persian: بيدخل, also Romanized as Bīd Khal) is a village in Bakesh-e Do Rural District, in the Central District of Mamasani County, Fars province, Iran. At the 2006 census, its population was 115, in 21 families.
