= Movelah =

Village in Lorestan province, Iran

Movelah Persian: موله
- Village
- Location within Iran
- Coordinates: 33°28′15″N 47°53′55″E
- Country: Iran
- Province: Lorestan
- County: Chegeni
- District: Veysian
- Rural District: Veysian

Population (2016)
  - Total: Below reporting threshold
- Time zone: UTC+3:30 (IRST)

Movelah (Persian: موله) (Note: Also known as Movelah-ye Kālīāb) is a village in Veysian Rural District of Veysian District in Chegeni County, (Note: Formerly Dowreh County) Lorestan province, Iran.

== Demographics ==
=== Population ===
At the time of the 2006 National Census, the village's population was 19 in four households, when it was in Khorramabad County. The following census in 2011 counted a population below the reporting threshold, by which time the district had been separated from the county in the establishment of Dowreh County. (Note: Renamed Chegeni County) The 2016 census again measured the population of the village as below the reporting threshold.
