= Kumas =

Village in Lorestan province, Iran

Kumas Persian: كوماس
- Village
- Location within Iran
- Coordinates: 33°25′07″N 48°09′02″E
- Country: Iran
- Province: Lorestan
- County: Chegeni
- District: Veysian
- Rural District: Shurab

Population (2016)
  - Total: 232
- Time zone: UTC+3:30 (IRST)

Kumas (Persian: كوماس) (Note: Also romanized as Kūmās; also known as Khūmās) is a village in Shurab Rural District of Veysian District in Chegeni County, (Note: Formerly Dowreh County) Lorestan province, Iran.

== Demographics ==
=== Population ===
At the time of the 2006 National Census, the village's population was 255 in 57 households, when it was in Khorramabad County. The following census in 2011 counted 232 people in 61 households, by which time the district had been separated from the county in the establishment of Dowreh County. (Note: Renamed Chegeni County) The 2016 census measured the population of the village as 232 people in 72 households.
