= Barreh =

Barreh بره
- Village
- Location within Iran
- Coordinates: 30°12′54″N 51°14′49″E
- Country: Iran
- Province: Fars
- County: Mamasani
- Bakhsh: Central
- Rural District: Bakesh-e Do

Population (2006)
  - Total: 52
- Time zone: UTC+3:30 (IRST)
  - Summer (DST): UTC+4:30 (IRDT)

Barreh (Persian: بره) is a village in Bakesh-e Do Rural District, in the Central District of Mamasani County, Fars province, Iran. As of the 2006 census, its population was 52, in 11 families.
