= Tall-e Salar =

Village in Lorestan province, Iran

Tall-e Salar Persian: تل مراد خاني
- Village
- Location within Iran
- Coordinates: 33°23′03″N 48°10′33″E
- Country: Iran
- Province: Lorestan
- County: Chegeni
- District: Veysian
- Rural District: Shurab

Population (2016)
  - Total: 89
- Time zone: UTC+3:30 (IRST)

Tall-e Salar (Persian: تل سالار) (Note: Also romanized as Tall-e Sālār) is a village in Shurab Rural District of Veysian District in Chegeni County, (Note: Formerly Dowreh County) Lorestan province, Iran.

== Demographics ==
=== Population ===
At the time of the 2006 National Census, the village's population was 244 in 53 households, when it was in Khorramabad County. The following census in 2011 counted 281 people in 63 households, by which time the district had been separated from the county in the establishment of Dowreh County. (Note: Renamed Chegeni County) The 2016 census measured the population of the village as 239 people in 67 households.
