= Rostam Khan Judaki =

Village in Lorestan province, Iran

Rostam Khan Judaki Persian: رستم خان جودکي
- Village
- Location within Iran
- Coordinates: 33°36′56″N 47°50′49″E
- Country: Iran
- Province: Lorestan
- County: Chegeni
- District: Veysian
- Rural District: Veysian

Population (2016)
  - Total: 25
- Time zone: UTC+3:30 (IRST)

Rostam Khan Judaki (Persian: رستم خان جودکي) (Note: Also romanized as Rostam Khān Jūdakī; also known as Rostam Khān and Rustam Khān) is a village in Veysian Rural District of Veysian District in Chegeni County, (Note: Formerly Dowreh County) Lorestan province, Iran.

== Demographics ==
=== Population ===
At the time of the 2006 National Census, the village's population was 24 in six households, when it was in Khorramabad County. The following census in 2011 counted 24 people in seven households, by which time the district had been separated from the county in the establishment of Dowreh County. (Note: Renamed Chegeni County) The 2016 census measured the population of the village as 25 people in seven households.
