= Pol-e Shurab-e Pain =

Village in Lorestan province, Iran

Pol-e Shurab-e Pain Persian: پل شورآ ب پايين
- Village
- Location within Iran
- Coordinates: 33°27′31″N 48°11′23″E
- Country: Iran
- Province: Lorestan
- County: Chegeni
- District: Veysian
- Rural District: Shurab

Population (2016)
  - Total: 60
- Time zone: UTC+3:30 (IRST)

Pol-e Shurab-e Pain (Persian: پل شورآ ب پايين) (Note: Also romanized as Pol-e Shūrāb-e Pā’īn; formerly known as Judel Del (جودل دل), also romanized as Jūdel Del; also known as Del Del) is a village in Shurab Rural District of Veysian District in Chegeni County, (Note: Formerly Dowreh County) Lorestan province, Iran.

== Demographics ==
=== Population ===
At the time of the 2006 National Census, the village's population, as Judel Del, was 86 in 21 households, when it was in Khorramabad County. The following census in 2011 counted 61 people in 16 households, by which time the district had been separated from the county in the establishment of Dowreh County. (Note: Renamed Chegeni County) The village was listed as Pol-e Shurab-e Pain. The 2016 census measured the population of the village as 60 people in 19 households.
