= Samakhun =

Village in Razavi Khorasan province, Iran

Samakhun Persian: سماخون
- Village
- Location within Iran
- Coordinates: 35°31′24″N 60°18′54″E
- Country: Iran
- Province: Razavi Khorasan
- County: Torbat-e Jam
- District: Nasrabad
- Rural District: Karizan

Population (2016)
  - Total: 1,094
- Time zone: UTC+3:30 (IRST)

Samakhun (Persian: سماخون) (Note: Also romanized as Samākhūn; also known as Samākhon and Sīmākhūn) is a village in Karizan Rural District of Nasrabad District in Torbat-e Jam County, Razavi Khorasan province, Iran.

== Demographics ==
=== Population ===
At the time of the 2006 National Census, the village's population was 1,016 in 221 households. The following census in 2011 counted 1,100 people in 277 households. The 2016 census measured the population of the village as 1,094 people in 326 households.
