= Javanabad =

Village in Lorestan province, Iran

Javanabad Persian: جوان اباد
- Village
- Location within Iran
- Coordinates: 33°30′47″N 48°00′20″E
- Country: Iran
- Province: Lorestan
- County: Chegeni
- District: Veysian
- Rural District: Veysian

Population (2016)
  - Total: 184
- Time zone: UTC+3:30 (IRST)

Javanabad (Persian: جوان اباد) (Note: Also romanized as Javānābād; also known as Delbar-e Rok Rok) is a village in Veysian Rural District of Veysian District in Chegeni County, (Note: Formerly Dowreh County) Lorestan province, Iran.

== Demographics ==
=== Population ===
At the time of the 2006 National Census, the village's population was 255 in 61 households, when it was in Khorramabad County. The following census in 2011 counted 231 people in 64 households, by which time the district had been separated from the county in the establishment of Dowreh County. (Note: Renamed Chegeni County) The 2016 census measured the population of the village as 184 people in 59 households.
