= Momenabad, Torbat-e Jam =

Village in Razavi Khorasan province, Iran

Momenabad Persian: مومن اباد
- Village
- Location within Iran
- Coordinates: 35°28′19″N 60°12′18″E
- Country: Iran
- Province: Razavi Khorasan
- County: Torbat-e Jam
- District: Nasrabad
- Rural District: Karizan

Population (2016)
  - Total: 2,056
- Time zone: UTC+3:30 (IRST)

Momenabad (Persian: مؤمن‌آباد) (Note: Also romanized as Mo’menābād) is a village in Karizan Rural District of Nasrabad District in Torbat-e Jam County, Razavi Khorasan province, Iran.

== Demographics ==
=== Population ===
At the time of the 2006 National Census, the village's population was 2,165 in 505 households. The following census in 2011 counted 2,218 people in 634 households. The 2016 census measured the population of the village as 2,056 people in 678 households.
