= Kariz-e Now, Nasrabad =

Village in Razavi Khorasan province, Iran

Kariz-e Now Persian: كاريزنو
- Village
- Location within Iran
- Coordinates: 35°29′37″N 60°10′29″E
- Country: Iran
- Province: Razavi Khorasan
- County: Torbat-e Jam
- District: Nasrabad
- Rural District: Karizan

Population (2016)
  - Total: 2,107
- Time zone: UTC+3:30 (IRST)

Kariz-e Now (Persian: كاريزنو) (Note: Also romanized as Kārīz Now, Kārīz-e Now, and Kārīz-i-Nau; also known as Kahrīz-e Now and Kārez-i-Nau) is a village in, and the capital of, Karizan Rural District in Nasrabad District of Torbat-e Jam County, Razavi Khorasan province, Iran.

== Demographics ==
=== Population ===
At the time of the 2006 National Census, the village's population was 2,126 in 519 households. The following census in 2011 counted 2,379 people in 615 households. The 2016 census measured the population of the village as 2,107 people in 617 households.
