= Khorramabad, Torbat-e Jam =

Village in Razavi Khorasan province, Iran

Khorramabad Persian: خرم اباد
- Village
- Location within Iran
- Coordinates: 35°23′05″N 60°23′34″E
- Country: Iran
- Province: Razavi Khorasan
- County: Torbat-e Jam
- District: Nasrabad
- Rural District: Bala Jam

Population (2016)
  - Total: 1,158
- Time zone: UTC+3:30 (IRST)

Khorramabad (Persian: خرم اباد) (Note: Also romanized as Khorramābād) is a village in Bala Jam Rural District of Nasrabad District in Torbat-e Jam County, Razavi Khorasan province, Iran.

== Demographics ==
=== Population ===
At the time of the 2006 National Census, the village's population was 1,178 in 283 households. The following census in 2011 counted 1,174 people in 345 households. The 2016 census measured the population of the village as 1,158 people in 332 households.
