= Ab Morvarid =

Ab Morvarid ابمرواريد
- Village
- Location within Iran
- Coordinates: 30°10′08″N 51°23′56″E
- Country: Iran
- Province: Fars
- County: Mamasani
- Bakhsh: Central
- Rural District: Bakesh-e Do

Population (2006)
  - Total: 109
- Time zone: UTC+3:30 (IRST)
  - Summer (DST): UTC+4:30 (IRDT)

Ab Morvarid (Persian: ابمرواريد, also Romanized as Āb Morvārīd; also known as Āb Morvārīd-e Bardangān and Āb Morvārīd Soflá) is a village in Bakesh-e Do Rural District, in the Central District of Mamasani County, Fars province, Iran. At the 2006 census, its population was 109, in 28 families.
