= Benruteleh =

Village in Lorestan province, Iran

Benruteleh Persian: بن روتله
- Village
- Location within Iran
- Coordinates: 33°28′31″N 48°07′08″E
- Country: Iran
- Province: Lorestan
- County: Chegeni
- District: Veysian
- Rural District: Shurab

Population (2016)
  - Total: 52
- Time zone: UTC+3:30 (IRST)

Benruteleh (Persian: بن روتله) (Note: Also romanized as Benrūteleh) is a village in Shurab Rural District of Veysian District in Chegeni County, (Note: Formerly Dowreh County) Lorestan province, Iran.

== Demographics ==
=== Population ===
At the time of the 2006 National Census, the village's population was 55 in 12 households, when it was in Khorramabad County. The following census in 2011 counted 59 people in 14 households, by which time the district had been separated from the county in the establishment of Dowreh County. (Note: Renamed Chegeni County) The 2016 census measured the population of the village as 52 people in 14 households.
