= Taqiabad, Torbat-e Jam =

Village in Razavi Khorasan province, Iran

Taqiabad Persian: تقي اباد
- Village
- Location within Iran
- Coordinates: 35°23′22″N 60°24′24″E
- Country: Iran
- Province: Razavi Khorasan
- County: Torbat-e Jam
- District: Nasrabad
- Rural District: Bala Jam

Population (2016)
  - Total: 592
- Time zone: UTC+3:30 (IRST)

Taqiabad (Persian: تقی‌آباد) (Note: Also romanized as Taqīābād; also known as Tākīābād) is a village in Bala Jam Rural District of Nasrabad District in Torbat-e Jam County, Razavi Khorasan province, Iran.

== Demographics ==
=== Population ===
At the time of the 2006 National Census, the village's population was 575 in 131 households. The following census in 2011 counted 636 people in 169 households. The 2016 census measured the population of the village as 592 people in 168 households.
