= Jafarabad, Torbat-e Jam =

Village in Razavi Khorasan province, Iran

Jafarabad Persian: جعفراباد
- Village
- Location within Iran
- Coordinates: 35°27′49″N 60°21′00″E
- Country: Iran
- Province: Razavi Khorasan
- County: Torbat-e Jam
- District: Nasrabad
- Rural District: Bala Jam

Population (2016)
  - Total: 1,393
- Time zone: UTC+3:30 (IRST)

Jafarabad (Persian: جعفراباد) (Note: Also romanized as Ja‘farābād) is a village in Bala Jam Rural District of Nasrabad District in Torbat-e Jam County, Razavi Khorasan province, Iran.

== Demographics ==
=== Population ===
At the time of the 2006 National Census, the village's population was 1,186 in 280 households. The following census in 2011 counted 1,372 people in 353 households. The 2016 census measured the population of the village as 1,393 people in 396 households.
