= Tall-e Ajam =

Village in Lorestan province, Iran

Tall-e Ajam Persian: تل عجم
- Village
- Location within Iran
- Coordinates: 33°22′18″N 48°11′20″E
- Country: Iran
- Province: Lorestan
- County: Chegeni
- District: Veysian
- Rural District: Shurab

Population (2016)
  - Total: 61
- Time zone: UTC+3:30 (IRST)

Tall-e Ajam (Persian: تل عجم) (Note: Also romanized as Tall-e ‘Ajam and Tell Ajam; also known as Tall Jem, Tall-e Bālā (تل بالا), and Tall-e ‘Olyā) is a village in Shurab Rural District of Veysian District in Chegeni County, (Note: Formerly Dowreh County) Lorestan province, Iran.

== Demographics ==
=== Population ===
At the time of the 2006 National Census, the village's population was 95 in 23 households, when it was in Khorramabad County. The following census in 2011 counted 47 people in 10 households, by which time the district had been separated from the county in the establishment of Dowreh County. (Note: Renamed Chegeni County) The 2016 census measured the population of the village as 61 people in 18 households.
