= Sourav =

Sourav, Sourabh, Saurabh, and Saurav, are Indian masculine given names. Saurav and Sourav bears the meaning of celestial or divine while Saurabh and Sourabh mean fragrance in Sanskrit.

== Notable people ==
=== Saurabh ===
- Saurabh Dube, Indian scholar in history, anthropology, and subaltern studies
- Saurabh Kalia (1976–1999), Indian Army officer who died as a prisoner of war
- Saurabh Kumar, Indian entrepreneur, co-founder of Grofers (Blinkit)
- Saurabh Narain Singh (born 1975), politician from Jharkhand, Indian National Congress
- Saurabh Shukla, Indian film and television actor, director, and screenwriter
- Saurabh Singh Shekhawat, Indian Army colonel and mountaineer
- Saurabh Tiwary (born 1989), Indian cricketer
- Saurabh Verma (born 1981), Indian-born American cricketer

=== Saurav ===
- Saurav Ghosal, Indian squash player

=== Sourabh ===
- Sourabh Goho (born 1991), Indian tabla player
- Sourabh Majumdar (born 1999), Indian cricketer
- Sourabh Raaj Jain (born 1985), Indian television actor and model
- Sourabh Verma (born 1992), Indian badminton player
- Sourabh Vij (born 1987), Indian shot putter

=== Sourav ===
- Sourav Chatterjee, Indian mathematician
- Sourav Das (footballer), Indian footballer
- Sourav De (born 1974), Indian film director, producer, and screenwriter
- Sourav Dubey, Indian cricketer
- Sourav Ganguly (born 1972), Indian cricketer and BCCI president
- Sourav Mishra, Indian journalist
- Sourav Pal, Indian professor of chemistry
- Sourav Sarkar, Indian cricketer

== See also ==
- Sarabbagh
- Sharab (disambiguation)
- Sharabha
- Shurab (disambiguation)
