= Asar Zamin-e Kaliab =

Village in Lorestan province, Iran

Asar Zamin-e Kaliab Persian: اثرزمين كالياب
- Village
- Location within Iran
- Coordinates: 33°28′09″N 47°53′29″E
- Country: Iran
- Province: Lorestan
- County: Chegeni
- District: Veysian
- Rural District: Veysian

Population (2016)
  - Total: 42
- Time zone: UTC+3:30 (IRST)

Asar Zamin-e Kaliab (Persian: اثرزمين كالياب) (Note: Also romanized as As̄ar Zamīn-e Kālīāb; also known as As̄ar Zamīn) is a village in Veysian Rural District of Veysian District in Chegeni County, (Note: Formerly Dowreh County) Lorestan province, Iran.

== Demographics ==
=== Population ===
At the time of the 2006 National Census, the village's population was 64 in 15 households, when it was in Khorramabad County. The following census in 2011 counted 54 people in 15 households, by which time the district had been separated from the county in the establishment of Dowreh County. (Note: Renamed Chegeni County) The 2016 census measured the population of the village as 42 people in 16 households.
