= Tall-e Morad Khani =

Village in Lorestan province, Iran

Tall-e Morad Khani Persian: تل مراد خاني
- Village
- Location within Iran
- Coordinates: 33°23′09″N 48°09′27″E
- Country: Iran
- Province: Lorestan
- County: Chegeni
- District: Veysian
- Rural District: Shurab

Population (2016)
  - Total: 89
- Time zone: UTC+3:30 (IRST)

Tall-e Morad Khani (Persian: تل مراد خاني) (Note: Also romanized as Tall-e Morād Khānī; also known as Tall-e Ḩājjī Morād Khānī and Tall-e Morādkhān) is a village in Shurab Rural District of Veysian District in Chegeni County, (Note: Formerly Dowreh County) Lorestan province, Iran.

== Demographics ==
=== Population ===
At the time of the 2006 National Census, the village's population was 111 in 19 households, when it was in Khorramabad County. The following census in 2011 counted 87 people in 17 households, by which time the district had been separated from the county in the establishment of Dowreh County. (Note: Renamed Chegeni County) The 2016 census measured the population of the village as 89 people in 22 households.
