= Tall-e Nemat =

Village in Lorestan province, Iran

Tall-e Nemat Persian: تل نعمت
- Village
- Location within Iran
- Coordinates: 33°23′42″N 48°09′18″E
- Country: Iran
- Province: Lorestan
- County: Chegeni
- District: Veysian
- Rural District: Shurab

Population (2016)
  - Total: 136
- Time zone: UTC+3:30 (IRST)

Tall-e Nemat (Persian: تل نعمت) (Note: Also romanized as Tal-e Neʿmat and Tall-e Neʿmat; also known as Shahīd Bāhonar, Tahel, Tal Mīān-e Neʿmat, Tall-e Shahīd Bāhonar, and Tel) is a village in Shurab Rural District of Veysian District in Chegeni County, (Note: Formerly Dowreh County) Lorestan province, Iran.

== Demographics ==
=== Population ===
At the time of the 2006 National Census, the village's population was 187 in 36 households, when it was in Khorramabad County. The following census in 2011 counted 154 people in 37 households, by which time the district had been separated from the county in the establishment of Dowreh County. (Note: Renamed Chegeni County) The 2016 census measured the population of the village as 136 people in 34 households.
