= Karizan-e Molla Ahmad =

Karizan-e Molla Ahmad كاريزان ملااحمد
- Village
- Location within Iran
- Coordinates: 35°25′29″N 60°07′06″E
- Country: Iran
- Province: Razavi Khorasan
- County: Torbat-e Jam
- Bakhsh: Nasrabad
- Rural District: Karizan

Population (2006)
  - Total: 246
- Time zone: UTC+3:30 (IRST)
  - Summer (DST): UTC+4:30 (IRDT)

Karizan-e Molla Ahmad (Persian: كاريزان ملااحمد, also Romanized as Kārīzān-e Mollā Aḩmad; also known as Kārīzān-e Mollā Moḩammad, Kārīzān, and Kārīzūn) is a village in Karizan Rural District, Nasrabad District, Torbat-e Jam County, Razavi Khorasan Province, Iran. At the 2006 census, its population was 246, made up of 65 families.
