= Bostan Rud Sharaf =

Village in Lorestan province, Iran

Bostan Rud Sharaf Persian: بستان رود شرف
- Village
- Location within Iran
- Coordinates: 33°29′03″N 48°08′57″E
- Country: Iran
- Province: Lorestan
- County: Chegeni
- District: Veysian
- Rural District: Shurab

Population (2016)
  - Total: 155
- Time zone: UTC+3:30 (IRST)

Bostan Rud Sharaf (Persian: بستان رود شرف) (Note: Also romanized as Bostān Rūd Sharaf; also known as Bostān Rūd, Bostān Rūd-e Soflá, and Sharaf) is a village in Shurab Rural District of Veysian District in Chegeni County, (Note: Formerly Dowreh County) Lorestan province, Iran.

== Demographics ==
=== Population ===
At the time of the 2006 National Census, the village's population was 198 in 46 households, when it was in Khorramabad County. The following census in 2011 counted 189 people in 48 households, by which time the district had been separated from the county in the establishment of Dowreh County. (Note: Renamed Chegeni County) The 2016 census measured the population of the village as 155 people in 47 households.
