= Somsara-ye Sofla =

Somsara-ye Sofla سمسراي سفلي
- Village
- Location within Iran
- Coordinates: 35°21′51″N 60°17′55″E
- Country: Iran
- Province: Razavi Khorasan
- County: Torbat-e Jam
- Bakhsh: Nasrabad
- Rural District: Bala Jam

Population (2006)
  - Total: 206
- Time zone: UTC+3:30 (IRST)
  - Summer (DST): UTC+4:30 (IRDT)

Somsara-ye Sofla (Persian: سمسراي سفلي, also Romanized as Somsarā-ye Soflá; also known as Somsarā Pā’īn and Somsarā-ye Pā’īn) is a village in Bala Jam Rural District, Nasrabad District, Torbat-e Jam County, Razavi Khorasan Province, Iran. At the 2006 census, its population was 206, in 42 families.
