= Tall-e Amanollah =

Village in Lorestan province, Iran

Tall-e Amanollah Persian: تل امان اله
- Village
- Location within Iran
- Country: Iran
- Province: Lorestan
- County: Chegeni
- District: Veysian
- Rural District: Shurab

Population (2016)
  - Total: 23
- Time zone: UTC+3:30 (IRST)

Tall-e Amanollah (Persian: تل امان اله) (Note: Also romanized as Tall-e Amānollāh) is a village in Shurab Rural District of Veysian District in Chegeni County, (Note: Formerly Dowreh County) Lorestan province, Iran.

== Demographics ==
=== Population ===
At the time of the 2006 National Census, the village's population was 25 in eight households, when it was in Khorramabad County. The following census in 2011 counted 22 people in five households, by which time the district had been separated from the county in the establishment of Dowreh County. (Note: Renamed Chegeni County) The 2016 census measured the population of the village as 23 people in five households.
