= Cham-e Divan =

Village in Lorestan province, Iran

Cham-e Divan Persian: چم ديوان
- Village
- Location within Iran
- Coordinates: 33°29′20″N 48°00′14″E
- Country: Iran
- Province: Lorestan
- County: Chegeni
- District: Veysian
- Rural District: Veysian

Population (2016)
  - Total: 892
- Time zone: UTC+3:30 (IRST)

Cham-e Divan (Persian: چم ديوان (Note: Also romanized as Cham-e Dīvān) is a village in Veysian Rural District of Veysian District in Chegeni County, (Note: Formerly Dowreh County) Lorestan province, Iran.

== Demographics ==
=== Population ===
At the time of the 2006 National Census, the village's population was 884 in 192 households, when it was in Khorramabad County. The following census in 2011 counted 897 people in 252 households, by which time the district had been separated from the county in the establishment of Dowreh County. (Note: Renamed Chegeni County) The 2016 census measured the population of the village as 892 people in 279 households, the most populous in its rural district.
