= Dul Kabud =

Dul Kabud (Persian: دول كبو) may refer to:

- Dul Kabud, Ilam
- Dul Kabud, Lorestan
