= Naqareh-ye Naveh Kesh =

Village in Lorestan province, Iran

Naqareh-ye Naveh Kesh Persian: نقاره ناوه كش
- Village
- Location within Iran
- Coordinates: 33°29′24″N 48°07′04″E
- Country: Iran
- Province: Lorestan
- County: Chegeni
- District: Veysian
- Rural District: Shurab

Population (2016)
  - Total: 68
- Time zone: UTC+3:30 (IRST)

Naqareh-ye Naveh Kesh (Persian: نقاره ناوه كش) (Note: Also romanized as Naqāreh-ye Nāveh Kash and Naqāreh-ye Nāveh Kesh; also known as Nākura, Naqāreh, and Naqqareh) is a village in Shurab Rural District of Veysian District in Chegeni County, (Note: Formerly Dowreh County) Lorestan province, Iran.

== Demographics ==
=== Population ===
At the time of the 2006 National Census, the village's population was 103 in 27 households, when it was in Khorramabad County. The following census in 2011 counted 101 people in 32 households, by which time the district had been separated from the county in the establishment of Dowreh County. (Note: Renamed Chegeni County) The 2016 census measured the population of the village as 68 people in 26 households.
