= Tayab =

Village in Lorestan province, Iran

Tayab Persian: تاياب
- Village
- Location within Iran
- Coordinates: 33°29′07″N 48°07′35″E
- Country: Iran
- Province: Lorestan
- County: Chegeni
- District: Veysian
- Rural District: Shurab

Population (2016)
  - Total: 90
- Time zone: UTC+3:30 (IRST)

Tayab (Persian: تاياب) (Note: Also romanized as Tāyāb) is a village in Shurab Rural District of Veysian District in Chegeni County, (Note: Formerly Dowreh County) Lorestan province, Iran.

== Demographics ==
=== Population ===
At the time of the 2006 National Census, the village's population was 108 in 30 households, when it was in Khorramabad County. The following census in 2011 counted 97 people in 32 households, by which time the district had been separated from the county in the establishment of Dowreh County. (Note: Renamed Chegeni County) The 2016 census measured the population of the village as 90 people in 29 households.
