= Aliabad, Nasrabad =

Village in Razavi Khorasan province, Iran

Aliabad Persian: علي اباد
- Village
- Location within Iran
- Coordinates: 35°26′54″N 60°09′25″E
- Country: Iran
- Province: Razavi Khorasan
- County: Torbat-e Jam
- District: Nasrabad
- Rural District: Karizan

Population (2016)
  - Total: 587
- Time zone: UTC+3:30 (IRST)

Aliabad (Persian: علي اباد) (Note: Also romanized as ‘Alīābād) is a village in Karizan Rural District of Nasrabad District in Torbat-e Jam County, Razavi Khorasan province, Iran.

== Demographics ==
=== Population ===
At the time of the 2006 National Census, the village's population was 640 in 148 households. The following census in 2011 counted 584 people in 163 households. The 2016 census measured the population of the village as 587 people in 177 households.
