= Lajam Gir =

Village in Lorestan province, Iran

Lajam Gir Persian: لجامگير
- Village
- Location within Iran
- Coordinates: 33°29′16″N 48°06′32″E
- Country: Iran
- Province: Lorestan
- County: Chegeni
- District: Veysian
- Rural District: Shurab

Population (2016)
  - Total: 138
- Time zone: UTC+3:30 (IRST)

Lajam Gir (Persian: لجامگير) (Note: Also romanized as Lajām Gīr) is a village in Shurab Rural District of Veysian District in Chegeni County, (Note: Formerly Dowreh County) Lorestan province, Iran.

== Demographics ==
=== Population ===
At the time of the 2006 National Census, the village's population was 81 in 24 households, when it was in Khorramabad County. The following census in 2011 counted 106 people in 25 households, by which time the district had been separated from the county in the establishment of Dowreh County. (Note: Renamed Chegeni County) The 2016 census measured the population of the village as 138 people in 45 households.
