= Zahrakar-e Nesardeleh =

Village in Lorestan province, Iran

Zahrakar-e Nesardeleh Persian: زهراكارنساردله
- Village
- Location within Iran
- Coordinates: 33°28′45″N 48°06′36″E
- Country: Iran
- Province: Lorestan
- County: Chegeni
- District: Veysian
- Rural District: Shurab

Population (2016)
  - Total: 49
- Time zone: UTC+3:30 (IRST)

Zahrakar-e Nesardeleh (Persian: زهراكارنساردله) (Note: Also romanized as Zahrākār-e Nesārdeleh; also known as Zahrā Kār-e Nesādeleh) is a village in Shurab Rural District of Veysian District in Chegeni County, (Note: Formerly Dowreh County) Lorestan province, Iran.

== Demographics ==
=== Population ===
At the time of the 2006 National Census, the village's population was 76 in 15 households, when it was in Khorramabad County. The following census in 2011 counted 64 people in 17 households, by which time the district had been separated from the county in the establishment of Dowreh County. (Note: Renamed Chegeni County) The 2016 census measured the population of the village as 49 people in 15 households.
