= Zahrakar =

Village in Lorestan province, Iran

Zahrakar Persian: زهراكار
- Village
- Location within Iran
- Coordinates: 33°29′09″N 48°02′57″E
- Country: Iran
- Province: Lorestan
- County: Chegeni
- District: Veysian
- Rural District: Veysian

Population (2016)
  - Total: 209
- Time zone: UTC+3:30 (IRST)

Zahrakar (Persian: زهراكار) (Note: Also romanized as Zahrākār) is a village in Veysian Rural District of Veysian District in Chegeni County, (Note: Formerly Dowreh County) Lorestan province, Iran.

== Demographics ==
=== Population ===
At the time of the 2006 National Census, the village's population was 279 in 64 households, when it was in Khorramabad County. The following census in 2011 counted 265 people in 77 households, by which time the district had been separated from the county in the establishment of Dowreh County. (Note: Renamed Chegeni County) The 2016 census measured the population of the village as 209 people in 70 households.
