= Kalateh-ye Sufi =

Village in Razavi Khorasan province, Iran

Kalateh-ye Sufi Persian: كلاته صوفي
- Village
- Location within Iran
- Coordinates: 35°25′31″N 60°23′53″E
- Country: Iran
- Province: Razavi Khorasan
- County: Torbat-e Jam
- District: Nasrabad
- Rural District: Bala Jam

Population (2016)
  - Total: 1,718
- Time zone: UTC+3:30 (IRST)

Kalateh-ye Sufi (Persian: كلاته صوفي) (Note: Also romanized as Kalāteh-ye Şūfī) is a village in Bala Jam Rural District of Nasrabad District in Torbat-e Jam County, Razavi Khorasan province, Iran.

== Demographics ==
=== Population ===
At the time of the 2006 National Census, the village's population was 1,242 in 253 households. The following census in 2011 counted 1,528 people in 355 households. The 2016 census measured the population of the village as 1,718 people in 413 households.
