= Qaleh Shir =

Village in Razavi Khorasan province, Iran

Qaleh Shir Persian: قلعه شير
- Village
- Location within Iran
- Coordinates: 35°24′47″N 60°08′36″E
- Country: Iran
- Province: Razavi Khorasan
- County: Torbat-e Jam
- District: Nasrabad
- Rural District: Karizan

Population (2016)
  - Total: 1,514
- Time zone: UTC+3:30 (IRST)

Qaleh Shir (Persian: قلعه شير) (Note: Also romanized as Qal‘eh Shīr, Qal‘eh-ye Shīr, and Qal‘eh-i-Shīr; also known as Qal‘a-i-Shīr) is a village in Karizan Rural District of Nasrabad District in Torbat-e Jam County, Razavi Khorasan province, Iran.

== Demographics ==
=== Population ===
At the time of the 2006 National Census, the village's population was 1,427 in 342 households. The following census in 2011 counted 1,309 people in 370 households. The 2016 census measured the population of the village as 1,514 people in 427 households.
