= Garrmish-e Naderlu =

Garrmish-e Naderlu گرميش نادرلو
- Village
- Location within Iran
- Coordinates: 30°12′15″N 51°18′26″E
- Country: Iran
- Province: Fars
- County: Mamasani
- Bakhsh: Central
- Rural District: Bakesh-e Do

Population (2006)
  - Total: 103
- Time zone: UTC+3:30 (IRST)
  - Summer (DST): UTC+4:30 (IRDT)

Garrmish-e Naderlu (Persian: گرميش نادرلو, also Romanized as Garmīsh-e Nāderlū; also known as Garmīsh, Garmīū, and Garrmīsh) is a village in Bakesh-e Do Rural District, in the Central District of Mamasani County, Fars province, Iran. At the 2006 census, its population was 103, in 16 families. Garrmish-e Naderlu is a village located in the Isfahan province of Iran. The village is situated in the central part of the province and is known for its natural environment and historical significance.

The village is believed to have been founded in the 18th century and is named after its founder, Naderlu. The village is home to a number of historical buildings, including a traditional mosque and a caravanserai. The caravanserai, which is a type of inn for travelers, dates back to the Safavid era and is a tourist attraction in the area.

Garrmish-e Naderlu is surrounded by green hills and is located near the Zayandeh Rud river, which is a major source of irrigation for the region. The village is also home to a number of traditional gardens and orchards, which are known for their variety of fruits and nuts.

In terms of economy, Garrmish-e Naderlu is primarily an agricultural village, with the main crops being wheat, barley, and fruits. The village is also known for its traditional handicrafts, such as pottery and textile weaving.

The village is home to a mixed population of Persians and Kurds, and both languages are spoken in the village. As a result, the village is home to diverse cultures, with traditional festivals and ceremonies being held throughout the year.
