= Delbar-e Rok Rok =

Village in Lorestan province, Iran

Delbar-e Rok Rok Persian: دلبررك رك
- Village
- Location within Iran
- Coordinates: 33°30′31″N 48°00′25″E
- Country: Iran
- Province: Lorestan
- County: Chegeni
- District: Veysian
- Rural District: Veysian

Population (2016)
  - Total: 188
- Time zone: UTC+3:30 (IRST)

Delbar-e Rok Rok (Persian: دلبررک رک) is a village in Veysian Rural District of Veysian District in Chegeni County, (Note: Formerly Dowreh County) Lorestan province, Iran.

== Demographics ==
=== Population ===
At the time of the 2006 National Census, the village's population was 262 in 62 households, when it was in Khorramabad County. The following census in 2011 counted 226 people in 67 households, by which time the district had been separated from the county in the establishment of Dowreh County. (Note: Renamed Chegeni County) The 2016 census measured the population of the village as 188 people in 72 households.
