= Golzar, Veysian =

Village in Lorestan province, Iran

Golzar Persian: گلزار
- Village
- Location within Iran
- Country: Iran
- Province: Lorestan
- County: Chegeni
- District: Veysian
- Rural District: Veysian

Population (2016)
  - Total: 96
- Time zone: UTC+3:30 (IRST)

Golzar (Persian: گلزار) (Note: Also romanized as Golzār; formerly known as Kharzar (خارزار), also romanized as Khārzār) is a village in Veysian Rural District of Veysian District in Chegeni County, (Note: Formerly Dowreh County) Lorestan province, Iran.

== Demographics ==
=== Population ===
At the time of the 2006 National Census, the village's population, as Kharzar, was 147 in 34 households, when it was in Khorramabad County. The following census in 2011 counted 104 people in 28 households, by which time the district had been separated from the county in the establishment of Dowreh County. (Note: Renamed Chegeni County) The village was listed as Golzar. The 2016 census measured the population of the village as 96 people in 33 households.
