= Somsara-ye Olya =

Somsara-ye Olya سمسراي عليا
- Village
- Location within Iran
- Coordinates: 35°20′41″N 60°16′42″E
- Country: Iran
- Province: Razavi Khorasan
- County: Torbat-e Jam
- Bakhsh: Nasrabad
- Rural District: Bala Jam

Population (2006)
  - Total: 119
- Time zone: UTC+3:30 (IRST)
  - Summer (DST): UTC+4:30 (IRDT)

Somsara-ye Olya (Persian: سمسراي عليا, also Romanized as Somsarā-ye ‘Olyā; also known as Somsarā Bālā and Somsarā-ye Bālā) is a village in Bala Jam Rural District, Nasrabad District, Torbat-e Jam County, Razavi Khorasan Province, Iran. At the 2006 census, its population was 119, in 31 families.

روستای شهید پرور سمسرا علیا
