= Jafarabad, Chegeni =

Village in Lorestan province, Iran

Jafarabad Persian: جعفراباد
- Village
- Location within Iran
- Coordinates: 33°29′50″N 48°07′16″E
- Country: Iran
- Province: Lorestan
- County: Chegeni
- District: Veysian
- Rural District: Shurab

Population (2016)
  - Total: 32
- Time zone: UTC+3:30 (IRST)

Jafarabad (Persian: جعفراباد) (Note: Also romanized as Ja‘farābād) is a village in Shurab Rural District of Veysian District in Chegeni County, (Note: Formerly Dowreh County) Lorestan province, Iran.

== Demographics ==
=== Population ===
At the time of the 2006 National Census, the village's population was 36 in six households, when it was in Khorramabad County. The following census in 2011 counted a population below the reporting threshold, by which time the district had been separated from the county in the establishment of Dowreh County. (Note: Renamed Chegeni County) The 2016 census measured the population of the village as 32 people in seven households.
