= Qaleh-ye Naveh Kesh =

Village in Lorestan province, Iran

Qaleh-ye Naveh Kesh Persian: قلعه ناوه كش
- Village
- Location within Iran
- Country: Iran
- Province: Lorestan
- County: Chegeni
- District: Veysian
- Rural District: Shurab

Population (2016)
  - Total: 37
- Time zone: UTC+3:30 (IRST)

Qaleh-ye Naveh Kesh (Persian: قلعه ناوه كش) (Note: Also romanized as Qal‘eh-ye Nāveh Kesh) is a village in Shurab Rural District of Veysian District in Chegeni County, (Note: Formerly Dowreh County) Lorestan province, Iran.

== Demographics ==
=== Population ===
At the time of the 2006 National Census, the village's population was 31 in seven households, when it was in Khorramabad County. The following census in 2011 counted 34 people in 10 households, by which time the district had been separated from the county in the establishment of Dowreh County. (Note: Renamed Chegeni County) The 2016 census measured the population of the village as 37 people in 10 households.
