= Kalateh-ye Bozorg, Razavi Khorasan =

Village in Razavi Khorasan province, Iran

Kalateh-ye Bozorg Persian: كلاته بزرگ
- Village
- Location within Iran
- Coordinates: 35°23′29″N 60°10′03″E
- Country: Iran
- Province: Razavi Khorasan
- County: Torbat-e Jam
- District: Nasrabad
- Rural District: Bala Jam

Population (2016)
  - Total: 1,591
- Time zone: UTC+3:30 (IRST)

Kalateh-ye Bozorg (Persian: كلاته بزرگ) (Note: Also romanized as Kalāteh Bozorg and Kalāteh-ye Bozorg; also known as Dūzang (دوزنگ), Kalāteh-ye Asad Beyg, Kalāteh-ye Dozang, and Kalāt-i-Buzurg) is a village in Bala Jam Rural District of Nasrabad District in Torbat-e Jam County, Razavi Khorasan province, Iran.

== Demographics ==
=== Population ===
At the time of the 2006 National Census, the village's population was 1,322 in 304 households. The following census in 2011 counted 1,389 people in 352 households. The 2016 census measured the population of the village as 1,591 people in 436 households.
