= Do Ab, Lorestan =

Village in Lorestan province, Iran

Do Ab Persian: دواب
- Village
- Location within Iran
- Coordinates: 33°29′53″N 47°58′01″E
- Country: Iran
- Province: Lorestan
- County: Chegeni
- District: Veysian
- Rural District: Veysian

Population (2016)
  - Total: 219
- Time zone: UTC+3:30 (IRST)

Do Ab (Persian: دواب) (Note: Also romanized as Do Āb; also known as Do Āb-e Kūr Shūrāb) is a village in Veysian Rural District of Veysian District in Chegeni County, (Note: Formerly Dowreh County) Lorestan province, Iran.

== Demographics ==
=== Population ===
At the time of the 2006 National Census, the village's population was 260 in 63 households, when it was in Khorramabad County. The following census in 2011 counted 242 people in 66 households, by which time the district had been separated from the county in the establishment of Dowreh County. (Note: Renamed Chegeni County) The 2016 census measured the population of the village as 219 people in 75 households.
