= Sefid Dasht, Lorestan =

Village in Lorestan province, Iran

Sefid Dasht Persian: سفيددشت
- Village
- Location within Iran
- Country: Iran
- Province: Lorestan
- County: Chegeni
- District: Veysian
- Rural District: Shurab

Population (2016)
  - Total: 45
- Time zone: UTC+3:30 (IRST)

Sefid Dasht (Persian: سفيددشت) (Note: Also romanized as Safīd Dasht and Sefīd Dasht; also known as Sapīd Dasht) is a village in Shurab Rural District of Veysian District in Chegeni County, (Note: Formerly Dowreh County) Lorestan province, Iran.

== Demographics ==
=== Population ===
At the time of the 2006 National Census, the village's population was 40 in 10 households, when it was in Khorramabad County. The following census in 2011 counted 54 people in 14 households, by which time the district had been separated from the county in the establishment of Dowreh County. (Note: Renamed Chegeni County) The 2016 census measured the population of the village as 45 people in 13 households.
