= Abbasabad, Chegeni =

Village in Lorestan province, Iran

Abbasabad Persian: عباس آباد
- Village
- Location within Iran
- Coordinates: 33°28′20″N 48°02′37″E
- Country: Iran
- Province: Lorestan
- County: Chegeni
- District: Veysian
- Rural District: Veysian

Population (2016)
  - Total: 89
- Time zone: UTC+3:30 (IRST)

Abbasabad (Persian: عباس آباد) (Note: Also romanized as ‘Abbāsābād; formerly known as Abbas-e Kalpat (عباس كلپت), also romanized as‘Abbās-e Kalpat; also known as ‘Abbās-e Galpat) is a village in Veysian Rural District of Veysian District in Chegeni County, (Note: Formerly Dowreh County) Lorestan province, Iran.

== Demographics ==
=== Population ===
At the time of the 2006 National Census, the village's population, as Abbas-e Kalpat, was 98 in 20 households, when it was in Khorramabad County. The following census in 2011 counted 77 people in 19 households, by which time the district had been separated from the county in the establishment of Dowreh County. (Note: Renamed Chegeni County) The village was listed as Abbasabad. The 2016 census measured the population of the village as 89 people in 23 households.
