= Chahar Gush =

Village in Lorestan province, Iran

Chahar Gush Persian: چهارگوش
- Village
- Location within Iran
- Coordinates: 33°28′37″N 48°07′31″E
- Country: Iran
- Province: Lorestan
- County: Chegeni
- District: Veysian
- Rural District: Shurab

Population (2016)
  - Total: 92
- Time zone: UTC+3:30 (IRST)

Chahar Gush (Persian: چهارگوش) (Note: Also romanized as Chahār Gūsh; also known as Charāh Gūsh) is a village in Shurab Rural District of Veysian District in Chegeni County, (Note: Formerly Dowreh County) Lorestan province, Iran.

== Demographics ==
=== Population ===
At the time of the 2006 National Census, the village's population was 146 in 34 households, when it was in Khorramabad County. The following census in 2011 counted 129 people in 38 households, by which time the district had been separated from the county in the establishment of Dowreh County. (Note: Renamed Chegeni County) The 2016 census measured the population of the village as 92 people in 30 households.
