= Tall-e Mohammad Yusof =

Village in Lorestan province, Iran

Tall-e Mohammad Yusof Persian: تل محمد يوسف
- Village
- Location within Iran
- Coordinates: 33°24′10″N 48°09′28″E
- Country: Iran
- Province: Lorestan
- County: Chegeni
- District: Veysian
- Rural District: Shurab

Population (2016)
  - Total: 117
- Time zone: UTC+3:30 (IRST)

Tall-e Mohammad Yusof (Persian: تل محمد يوسف) (Note: Also romanized as Tall-e Moḩammad Yūsof; also known as Halleh Tall (هله تل)) is a village in Shurab Rural District of Veysian District in Chegeni County, (Note: Formerly Dowreh County) Lorestan province, Iran.

== Demographics ==
=== Population ===
At the time of the 2006 National Census, the village's population was 170 in 39 households, when it was in Khorramabad County. The following census in 2011 counted 141 people in 41 households, by which time the district had been separated from the county in the establishment of Dowreh County. (Note: Renamed Chegeni County) The 2016 census measured the population of the village as 117 people in 38 households.
