= Qaleh-ye Sorkh, Nasrabad =

Village in Razavi Khorasan province, Iran

Qaleh-ye Sorkh Persian: قلعه سرخ
- Village
- Location within Iran
- Coordinates: 35°24′13″N 60°21′10″E
- Country: Iran
- Province: Razavi Khorasan
- County: Torbat-e Jam
- District: Nasrabad
- Rural District: Bala Jam

Population (2016)
  - Total: 1,411
- Time zone: UTC+3:30 (IRST)

Qaleh-ye Sorkh (Persian: قلعه سرخ) (Note: Also romanized as Qal‘eh Sorkh and Qal‘eh-ye Sorkh; also known as Qal‘a Surkh and Qal‘eh Surkh) is a village in Bala Jam Rural District of Nasrabad District in Torbat-e Jam County, Razavi Khorasan province, Iran.

== Demographics ==
=== Population ===
At the time of the 2006 National Census, the village's population was 1,344 in 316 households. The following census in 2011 counted 1,450 people in 398 households. The 2016 census measured the population of the village as 1,411 people in 400 households.
