= Pol-e Shurab-e Bala =

Village in Lorestan province, Iran

Pol-e Shurab-e Bala Persian: پل شوراب بالا
- Village
- Location within Iran
- Coordinates: 33°27′11″N 48°10′56″E
- Country: Iran
- Province: Lorestan
- County: Chegeni
- District: Veysian
- Rural District: Shurab

Population (2016)
  - Total: 124
- Time zone: UTC+3:30 (IRST)

Pol-e Shurab-e Bala (Persian: پل شوراب بالا) (Note: Also romanized as Pol-e Shūrāb-e Bālā; formerly known as Pol-e Shurab (پل شوراب), also romanized as Pol-e Shūrāb; also known as Pol-e Shūrāb-e ‘Olyā) is a village in Shurab Rural District of Veysian District in Chegeni County, (Note: Formerly Dowreh County) Lorestan province, Iran.

== Demographics ==
=== Population ===
At the time of the 2006 National Census, the village's population, as Pol-e Shurab, was 204 in 51 households, when it was in Khorramabad County. The following census in 2011 counted 133 people in 36 households, by which time the district had been separated from the county in the establishment of Dowreh County. (Note: Renamed Chegeni County) The village was listed as Pol-e Shurab-e Bala. The 2016 census measured the population of the village as 124 people in 40 households.
