= Kalateh-ye Fazel =

Village in Razavi Khorasan province, Iran

Kalateh-ye Fazel Persian: كلاته فاضل
- Village
- Location within Iran
- Coordinates: 35°25′15″N 60°26′46″E
- Country: Iran
- Province: Razavi Khorasan
- County: Torbat-e Jam
- District: Nasrabad
- Rural District: Bala Jam

Population (2016)
  - Total: 646
- Time zone: UTC+3:30 (IRST)

Kalateh-ye Fazel (Persian: كلاته فاضل) (Note: Also romanized as Kalāteh-ye Fāẕel) is a village in Bala Jam Rural District of Nasrabad District in Torbat-e Jam County, Razavi Khorasan province, Iran.

== Demographics ==
=== Population ===
At the time of the 2006 National Census, the village's population was 493 in 102 households. The following census in 2011 counted 574 people in 147 households. The 2016 census measured the population of the village as 646 people in 162 households.
