= Darreh-ye Mohammad Qoli =

Village in Lorestan province, Iran

Darreh-ye Mohammad Qoli Persian: دره محمدقلي
- Village
- Location within Iran
- Coordinates: 33°27′53″N 48°10′59″E
- Country: Iran
- Province: Lorestan
- County: Chegeni
- District: Veysian
- Rural District: Shurab

Population (2016)
  - Total: 31
- Time zone: UTC+3:30 (IRST)

Darreh-ye Mohammad Qoli (Persian: دره محمدقلي) (Note: Also romanized as Darreh-ye Moḩammad Qolī) is a village in Shurab Rural District of Veysian District in Chegeni County, (Note: Formerly Dowreh County) Lorestan province, Iran.

== Demographics ==
=== Population ===
At the time of the 2006 National Census, the village's population was 23 in five households, when it was in Khorramabad County. The following census in 2011 counted 30 people in eight households, by which time the district had been separated from the county in the establishment of Dowreh County. (Note: Renamed Chegeni County) The 2016 census measured the population of the village as 31 people in 10 households.
