= Kushki, Chegeni =

Village in Lorestan province, Iran

Kushki Persian: كوشكي
- Village
- Location within Iran
- Coordinates: 33°28′48″N 48°03′15″E
- Country: Iran
- Province: Lorestan
- County: Chegeni
- District: Veysian
- Rural District: Veysian

Population (2016)
  - Total: 127
- Time zone: UTC+3:30 (IRST)

Kushki (Persian: كوشكي) (Note: Also romanized as Kūshkī) is a village in Veysian Rural District of Veysian District in Chegeni County, (Note: Formerly Dowreh County) Lorestan province, Iran.

== Demographics ==
=== Population ===
At the time of the 2006 National Census, the village's population was 189 in 47 households, when it was in Khorramabad County. The following census in 2011 counted 189 people in 56 households, by which time the district had been separated from the county in the establishment of Dowreh County. (Note: Renamed Chegeni County) The 2016 census measured the population of the village as 127 people in 41 households.
