= Tang-e Musa =

Village in Lorestan province, Iran

Tang-e Musa Persian: تنگ موسي
- Village
- Location within Iran
- Coordinates: 33°31′09″N 47°59′55″E
- Country: Iran
- Province: Lorestan
- County: Chegeni
- District: Veysian
- Rural District: Veysian

Population (2016)
  - Total: 97
- Time zone: UTC+3:30 (IRST)

Tang-e Musa (Persian: تنگ موسي) (Note: Also romanized as Tang-e Mūsá) is a village in Veysian Rural District of Veysian District in Chegeni County, (Note: Formerly Dowreh County) Lorestan province, Iran.

== Demographics ==
=== Population ===
At the time of the 2006 National Census, the village's population was 139 in 35 households, when it was in Khorramabad County. The following census in 2011 counted 114 people in 37 households, by which time the district had been separated from the county in the establishment of Dowreh County. (Note: Renamed Chegeni County) The 2016 census measured the population of the village as 97 people in 37 households.
