= Pahalat =

Village in Lorestan province, Iran

Pahalat Persian: پاهلت
- Village
- Location within Iran
- Coordinates: 33°29′34″N 48°04′07″E
- Country: Iran
- Province: Lorestan
- County: Chegeni
- District: Veysian
- Rural District: Veysian

Population (2016)
  - Total: 174
- Time zone: UTC+3:30 (IRST)

Pahalat (Persian: پاهلت) (Note: Also romanized as Pāhalat and Pāhlat; also known as Pā ‘Allat and Pā‘elat) is a village in Veysian Rural District of Veysian District in Chegeni County, (Note: Formerly Dowreh County) Lorestan province, Iran.

== Demographics ==
=== Population ===
At the time of the 2006 National Census, the village's population was 216 in 53 households, when it was in Khorramabad County. The following census in 2011 counted 202 people in 57 households, by which time the district had been separated from the county in the establishment of Dowreh County. (Note: Renamed Chegeni County) The 2016 census measured the population of the village as 174 people in 52 households.
