= Posht-e Tang-e Chenar =

Village in Lorestan province, Iran

Posht-e Tang-e Chenar Persian: پشتتنگچنار
- Village
- Location within Iran
- Coordinates: 33°28′13″N 48°06′38″E
- Country: Iran
- Province: Lorestan
- County: Chegeni
- District: Veysian
- Rural District: Shurab

Population (2016)
  - Total: 30
- Time zone: UTC+3:30 (IRST)

Posht-e Tang-e Chenar (Persian: پشتتنگچنار) (Note: Also romanized as Posht Tang-e Chenār and Posht-e Tang-e Chenār; also known as Posht Tang and Posht-e Tang) is a village in Shurab Rural District of Veysian District in Chegeni County, (Note: Formerly Dowreh County) Lorestan province, Iran.

== Demographics ==
=== Population ===
At the time of the 2006 National Census, the village's population was 54 in 13 households, when it was in Khorramabad County. The following census in 2011 counted 36 people in 10 households, by which time the district had been separated from the county in the establishment of Dowreh County. (Note: Renamed Chegeni County) The 2016 census measured the population of the village as 30 people in eight households.
