= Qaleh-ye Nashin Shahi =

Village in Lorestan province, Iran

Qaleh-ye Nashin Shahi Persian: قلعه نشين شاهي
- Village
- Location within Iran
- Coordinates: 33°28′18″N 48°08′50″E
- Country: Iran
- Province: Lorestan
- County: Chegeni
- District: Veysian
- Rural District: Shurab

Population (2016)
  - Total: 48
- Time zone: UTC+3:30 (IRST)

Qaleh-ye Nashin Shahi (Persian: قلعه نشين شاهي) (Note: Also romanized as Qalʿeh Nashīn Shāhī; also known as Qaleh-ye Shinshahi) is a village in Shurab Rural District of Veysian District in Chegeni County, (Note: Formerly Dowreh County) Lorestan province, Iran.

== Demographics ==
=== Population ===
At the time of the 2006 National Census, the village's population was 72 in 14 households, when it was in Khorramabad County. The following census in 2011 counted 53 people in 16 households, by which time the district had been separated from the county in the establishment of Dowreh County. (Note: Renamed Chegeni County) The 2016 census measured the population of the village as 48 people in 15 households.
