= Shiran Bisheh =

Village in Lorestan province, Iran

Shiran Bisheh Persian: شيران بيشه
- Village
- Location within Iran
- Coordinates: 33°28′01″N 48°10′05″E
- Country: Iran
- Province: Lorestan
- County: Chegeni
- District: Veysian
- Rural District: Shurab

Population (2016)
  - Total: 65
- Time zone: UTC+3:30 (IRST)

Shiran Bisheh (Persian: شيران بيشه) (Note: Also romanized as Shīrān Bīsheh) is a village in Shurab Rural District of Veysian District in Chegeni County, (Note: Formerly Dowreh County) Lorestan province, Iran.

== Demographics ==
=== Population ===
At the time of the 2006 National Census, the village's population was 76 in 18 households, when it was in Khorramabad County. The following census in 2011 counted 66 people in 21 households, by which time the district had been separated from the county in the establishment of Dowreh County. (Note: Renamed Chegeni County) The 2016 census measured the population of the village as 65 people in 19 households.
