= Sabzevar, Lorestan =

Village in Lorestan province, Iran

Sabzevar Persian: سبزوار
- Village
- Location within Iran
- Coordinates: 33°29′55″N 48°01′48″E
- Country: Iran
- Province: Lorestan
- County: Chegeni
- District: Veysian
- Rural District: Veysian

Population (2016)
  - Total: 703
- Time zone: UTC+3:30 (IRST)

Sabzevar (Persian: سبزوار) (Note: Also romanized as Sabzevār; also known as Godār-e Gūr Sefīd and Gūr Sefīd-e Sabzevār) is a village in Veysian Rural District of Veysian District in Chegeni County, (Note: Formerly Dowreh County) Lorestan province, Iran.

== Demographics ==
=== Population ===
At the time of the 2006 National Census, the village's population was 820 in 203 households, when it was in Khorramabad County. The following census in 2011 counted 811 people in 230 households, by which time the district had been separated from the county in the establishment of Dowreh County. (Note: Renamed Chegeni County) The 2016 census measured the population of the village as 703 people in 232 households.
