= Ahangari, Fars =

Village in Fars province, Iran

Ahangari Persian: اهنگري
- Village
- Location within Iran
- Coordinates: 30°07′05″N 51°26′17″E
- Country: Iran
- Province: Fars
- County: Mamasani
- District: Central
- Rural District: Bakesh-e Do

Population (2016)
  - Total: 871
- Time zone: UTC+3:30 (IRST)

Ahangari (Persian: اهنگري) (Note: Also romanized as Āhangarī; also known as Ānahgarī) is a village in, and the capital of, Bakesh-e Do Rural District of the Central District of Mamasani County, Fars province, Iran.

== Demographics ==
=== Population ===
At the time of the 2006 National Census, the village's population was 1,089 in 235 households. The following census in 2011 counted 1,195 people in 343 households. The 2016 census measured the population of the village as 871 people in 276 households. It was the most populous village in its rural district.
