= Dimah Mil Olya =

Dimah Mil Olya ديمه ميل عليا
- Village
- Location within Iran
- Coordinates: 30°06′46″N 51°27′33″E
- Country: Iran
- Province: Fars
- County: Mamasani
- Bakhsh: Central
- Rural District: Bakesh-e Do

Population (2006)
  - Total: 84
- Time zone: UTC+3:30 (IRST)
  - Summer (DST): UTC+4:30 (IRDT)

Dimah Mil Olya (Persian: ديمه ميل عليا, also Romanized as Dīmah Mīl 'Olyā; also known as Dīmeh-ye Mīl-e Bālā) is a village in Bakesh-e Do Rural District, in the Central District of Mamasani County, Fars province, Iran. At the 2006 census, its population was 84, in 20 families.
