= Cham Bagh-e Sofla =

Village in Lorestan province, Iran

Cham Bagh-e Sofla Persian: چم باغ سفلي
- Village
- Location within Iran
- Coordinates: 33°29′23″N 47°57′46″E
- Country: Iran
- Province: Lorestan
- County: Chegeni
- District: Veysian
- Rural District: Veysian

Population (2016)
  - Total: 118
- Time zone: UTC+3:30 (IRST)

Cham Bagh-e Sofla (Persian: چم باغ سفلي) (Note: Also romanized as Cham Bāgh-e Soflá) is a village in Veysian Rural District of Veysian District in Chegeni County, (Note: Formerly Dowreh County) Lorestan province, Iran.

== Demographics ==
=== Population ===
At the time of the 2006 National Census, the village's population was 163 in 46 households, when it was in Khorramabad County. The following census in 2011 counted 147 people in 44 households, by which time the district had been separated from the county in the establishment of Dowreh County. (Note: Renamed Chegeni County) The 2016 census measured the population of the village as 118 people in 37 households.
