= Farzali, Iran =

Village in Lorestan province, Iran

Farzali Persian: فرضالي
- Village
- Location within Iran
- Coordinates: 33°31′04″N 47°58′39″E
- Country: Iran
- Province: Lorestan
- County: Chegeni
- District: Veysian
- Rural District: Veysian

Population (2016)
  - Total: 60
- Time zone: UTC+3:30 (IRST)

Farzali (Persian: فرضالي) (Note: Also romanized as Farẕālī and Farẕ ‘Alī) is a village in Veysian Rural District of Veysian District in Chegeni County, (Note: Formerly Dowreh County) Lorestan province, Iran.

== Demographics ==
=== Population ===
At the time of the 2006 National Census, the village's population was 98 in 24 households, when it was in Khorramabad County. The following census in 2011 counted 76 people in 24 households, by which time the district had been separated from the county in the establishment of Dowreh County. (Note: Renamed Chegeni County) The 2016 census measured the population of the village as 60 people in 21 households.
