= Hasanabad, Nasrabad =

Village in Razavi Khorasan province, Iran

Hasanabad Persian: حسن اباد
- Village
- Location within Iran
- Coordinates: 35°29′16″N 60°17′21″E
- Country: Iran
- Province: Razavi Khorasan
- County: Torbat-e Jam
- District: Nasrabad
- Rural District: Karizan

Population (2016)
  - Total: 985
- Time zone: UTC+3:30 (IRST)

Hasanabad (Persian: حسن اباد) (Note: Also romanized as Ḩasanābād; also known as Hasānak) is a village in Karizan Rural District of Nasrabad District in Torbat-e Jam County, Razavi Khorasan province, Iran.

== Demographics ==
=== Population ===
At the time of the 2006 National Census, the village's population was 934 in 227 households. The following census in 2011 counted 961 people in 255 households. The 2016 census measured the population of the village as 985 people in 253 households.
