= Nasrabad, Razavi Khorasan =

City in Razavi Khorasan province, Iran

Nasrabad Persian: نصرآباد
- City
- Location within Iran
- Coordinates: 35°25′05″N 60°18′54″E
- Country: Iran
- Province: Razavi Khorasan
- County: Torbat-e Jam
- District: Nasrabad
- Established as a city: 1999

Population (2016)
  - Total: 7,460
- Time zone: UTC+3:30 (IRST)

Nasrabad (Persian: نصرآباد) (Note: Also romanized as Naşrābād; also known as Noşratābād and Nusratābād) is a city in, and the capital of, Nasrabad District in Torbat-e Jam County, Razavi Khorasan province, Iran. It also serves as the administrative center for Bala Jam Rural District. The village of Nasrabad was converted to a city in 1999.

== Demographics ==
=== Population ===
At the time of the 2006 National Census, the city's population was 6,835 in 1,599 households. The following census in 2011 counted 7,757 people in 2,015 households. The 2016 census measured the population of the city as 7,460 people in 2,025 households.
