= Karfaleh-ye Lavan =

Village in Lorestan province, Iran

Karfaleh-ye Lavan Persian: كرفله لاون
- Village
- Location within Iran
- Coordinates: 33°29′23″N 48°06′45″E
- Country: Iran
- Province: Lorestan
- County: Chegeni
- District: Veysian
- Rural District: Shurab

Population (2016)
  - Total: 86
- Time zone: UTC+3:30 (IRST)

Karfaleh-ye Lavan (Persian: كرفله لاون) (Note: Also romanized as Kerfeleh-ye Lāvan; also known as Karfaleh and Kerfeleh-ye Lāvand) is a village in Shurab Rural District of Veysian District in Chegeni County, (Note: Formerly Dowreh County) Lorestan province, Iran.

== Demographics ==
=== Population ===
At the time of the 2006 National Census, the village's population was 108 in 27 households, when it was in Khorramabad County. The following census in 2011 counted 71 people in 20 households, by which time the district had been separated from the county in the establishment of Dowreh County. (Note: Renamed Chegeni County) The 2016 census measured the population of the village as 86 people in 30 households.
