= Arabaçı =

Arabachy
- Municipality
- Azerbaijani: Arabaçı
- Location within Azerbaijan
- Coordinates: 40°39′N 45°26′E
- Country: Azerbaijan
- District: Gadabay

Population
  - Total: 1,124
- Time zone: UTC+4 (AZT)
  - Summer (DST): UTC+5 (AZT)

Arabaçı (also, Arabachy) is a village and municipality in the Gadabay District of Azerbaijan. It has a population of 1,124. The municipality consists of the villages of Arabachy and Farzaly.
