= Karfaleh, Lorestan =

Village in Lorestan province, Iran

Karfaleh Persian: كرفله
- Village
- Location within Iran
- Coordinates: 33°29′26″N 48°06′34″E
- Country: Iran
- Province: Lorestan
- County: Chegeni
- District: Veysian
- Rural District: Shurab

Population (2016)
  - Total: 64
- Time zone: UTC+3:30 (IRST)

Karfaleh (Persian: كرفله) (Note: Also known as Karfaleh-ye ‘Olyā, Karfaleh-ye Yek, and Kerfeleh-ye ‘Olyā) is a village in Shurab Rural District of Veysian District in Chegeni County, (Note: Formerly Dowreh County) Lorestan province, Iran.

== Demographics ==
=== Population ===
At the time of the 2006 National Census, the village's population was 75 in 20 households, when it was in Khorramabad County. The following census in 2011 counted 54 people in 15 households, by which time the district had been separated from the county in the establishment of Dowreh County. (Note: Renamed Chegeni County) The 2016 census measured the population of the village as 64 people in 23 households.
