= Shurab-e Tork =

Shurab-e Tork شوراب ترك
- Village
- Location within Iran
- Coordinates: 30°09′14″N 51°22′11″E
- Country: Iran
- Province: Fars
- County: Mamasani
- Bakhsh: Central
- Rural District: Bakesh-e Do

Population (2006)
  - Total: 55
- Time zone: UTC+3:30 (IRST)
  - Summer (DST): UTC+4:30 (IRDT)

Shurab-e Tork (Persian: شوراب ترك, also Romanized as Shūrāb-e Tork; also known as Shūr Āb) is a village in Bakesh-e Do Rural District, in the Central District of Mamasani County, Fars province, Iran. At the 2006 census, its population was 55, in 9 families.
