= Gholaman-e Sofla =

Village in Lorestan province, Iran

Gholaman-e Sofla Persian: غلامان سفلي
- Village
- Location within Iran
- Coordinates: 33°27′10″N 48°12′26″E
- Country: Iran
- Province: Lorestan
- County: Chegeni
- District: Veysian
- Rural District: Shurab

Population (2016)
  - Total: 190
- Time zone: UTC+3:30 (IRST)

Gholaman-e Sofla (Persian: غلامان سفلي) (Note: Also romanized as Gholāmān-e Soflá; also known as Gholāmān and Golāmān) is a village in Shurab Rural District of Veysian District in Chegeni County, (Note: Formerly Dowreh County) Lorestan province, Iran.

== Demographics ==
=== Population ===
At the time of the 2006 National Census, the village's population was 173 in 36 households, when it was in Khorramabad County. The following census in 2011 counted 202 people in 48 households, by which time the district had been separated from the county in the establishment of Dowreh County. (Note: Renamed Chegeni County) The 2016 census measured the population of the village as 190 people in 56 households.
