= Pireh Sorkh-e Pain =

Pireh Sorkh-e Pain پيره سرخ پائين
- Village
- Location within Iran
- Coordinates: 30°11′15″N 51°17′41″E
- Country: Iran
- Province: Fars
- County: Mamasani
- Bakhsh: Central
- Rural District: Bakesh-e Do

Population (2006)
  - Total: 20
- Time zone: UTC+3:30 (IRST)
  - Summer (DST): UTC+4:30 (IRDT)

Pireh Sorkh-e Pain (Persian: پيره سرخ پائين, also Romanized as Pīreh Sorkh-e Pā’īn; also known as Pir-i-Surkh, Pīr Sorkh, Pīr Sorkh-e Pā’īn, Pīr Sorkh Soflá, and Seyyed Laţīf) is a village in Bakesh-e Do Rural District, in the Central District of Mamasani County, Fars province, Iran. At the 2006 census, its population was 20, in 4 families.
