= Delbar Sadat-e Bala =

Village in Lorestan province, Iran

Delbar Sadat-e Bala Persian: دلبرسادات بالا
- Village
- Location within Iran
- Coordinates: 33°30′20″N 47°59′55″E
- Country: Iran
- Province: Lorestan
- County: Chegeni
- District: Veysian
- Rural District: Veysian

Population (2016)
  - Total: 161
- Time zone: UTC+3:30 (IRST)

Delbar Sadat-e Bala (Persian: دلبرسادات بالا) (Note: Also romanized as Delbar Sādāt-e Bālā; formerly known as Kaduney-e Olya (کادوني عليا), also romanized as Kādūney-e ‘Olyā and Kādūnī-e ‘Olyā; also known as Delbar, Delbar Sadat (دلبر سادات), Delbar Sādāt, and Delbar Sādāt-e ‘Olyā) is a village in Veysian Rural District of Veysian District in Chegeni County, (Note: Formerly Dowreh County) Lorestan province, Iran.

== Demographics ==
=== Population ===
At the time of the 2006 National Census, the village's population, as Kaduney-e Olya, was 227 in 54 households, when it was in Khorramabad County. The following census in 2011 counted 220 people in 54 households, by which time the district had been separated from the county in the establishment of Dowreh County. (Note: Renamed Chegeni County) The village was listed as Delbar Sadat-e Bala. The 2016 census measured the population of the village as 161 people in 54 households.
