= Chenar-e Golaban-e Do =

Village in Lorestan province, Iran

Chenar-e Golaban-e Do Persian: چنار گل آبان دو
- Village
- Location within Iran
- Coordinates: 33°29′38″N 47°53′23″E
- Country: Iran
- Province: Lorestan
- County: Chegeni
- District: Veysian
- Rural District: Veysian

Population (2016)
  - Total: 25
- Time zone: UTC+3:30 (IRST)

Chenar-e Golaban-e Do (Persian: چنار گل آبان دو) (Note: Also romanized as Chenār-e Golābān-e Do; formerly known as Chenar-e Golaban (چنارگل ابان), also romanized as Chenār-e Golābān; also known as Golābān-e Do and Nūshād Golābān-e Yeḵ (نوشادگلاابان يك)) is a village in Veysian Rural District of Veysian District in Chegeni County, (Note: Formerly Dowreh County) Lorestan province, Iran.

== Demographics ==
=== Population ===
At the time of the 2006 National Census, the village's population, as Chenar-e Golaban, was 84 in 20 households, when it was in Khorramabad County. The following census in 2011 counted 17 people in six households, by which time the district had been separated from the county in the establishment of Dowreh County. (Note: Renamed Chegeni County) The village was listed as Chenar-e Golaban-e Do. The 2016 census measured the population of the village as 25 people in seven households.
