= Shurab-e Olya, Torbat-e Jam =

Shurab-e Olya شوراب عليا
- Village
- Location within Iran
- Coordinates: 35°27′28″N 60°05′13″E
- Country: Iran
- Province: Razavi Khorasan
- County: Torbat-e Jam
- Bakhsh: Nasrabad
- Rural District: Karizan

Population (2006)
  - Total: 99
- Time zone: UTC+3:30 (IRST)
  - Summer (DST): UTC+4:30 (IRDT)

Shurab-e Olya (Persian: شوراب عليا, also Romanized as Shūrāb-e ‘Olyā; also known as Shūrāb and Shūrāb-e Bālā) is a village in Karizan Rural District, Nasrabad District, Torbat-e Jam County, Razavi Khorasan Province, Iran. At the 2006 census, its population was 99, in 25 families.
