= Shurab-e Najm-e Soheyli =

Village in Lorestan province, Iran

Shurab-e Najm-e Soheyli Persian: شوراب نجم سهيلي
- Village
- Location within Iran
- Coordinates: 33°27′52″N 48°09′37″E
- Country: Iran
- Province: Lorestan
- County: Chegeni
- District: Veysian
- Rural District: Shurab

Population (2016)
  - Total: 331
- Time zone: UTC+3:30 (IRST)

Shurab-e Najm-e Soheyli (Persian: شوراب نجم سهيلي) (Note: Also romanized as Shūrāb Najm-e Soheylī; also known as Shurab-e Sofla) is a village in, and the capital of, Shurab Rural District in Veysian District of Chegeni County, (Note: Formerly Dowreh County) Lorestan province, Iran.

== Demographics ==
=== Population ===
At the time of the 2006 National Census, the village's population was 415 in 99 households, when it was in Khorramabad County. The following census in 2011 counted 395 people in 107 households, by which time the district had been separated from the county in the establishment of Dowreh County. (Note: Renamed Chegeni County) The 2016 census measured the population of the village as 331 people in 99 households.
