= Delbar Sadat-e Vosta =

Village in Lorestan province, Iran

Delbar Sadat-e Vosta Persian: دلبر سادات وسطي
- Village
- Location within Iran
- Coordinates: 33°29′57″N 47°59′45″E
- Country: Iran
- Province: Lorestan
- County: Chegeni
- District: Veysian
- Rural District: Veysian

Population (2016)
  - Total: 101
- Time zone: UTC+3:30 (IRST)

Delbar Sadat-e Vosta (Persian: دلبر سادات وسطي) (Note: Also romanized as Delbar Sādāt-e Vosţá; formerly known as Kaduney-e Vosta (كادوني وسطي), also romanized as Kādūney-e Vosţá; also known as Delbar Sādāt) is a village in Veysian Rural District of Veysian District in Chegeni County, (Note: Formerly Dowreh County) Lorestan province, Iran.

== Demographics ==
=== Population ===
At the time of the 2006 National Census, the village's population, as Kaduney-e Vosta, was 110 in 23 households, when it was in Khorramabad County. The following census in 2011 counted 121 people in 32 households, by which time the district had been separated from the county in the establishment of Dowreh County. (Note: Renamed Chegeni County) The village was listed as Delbar Sadat-e Vosta. The 2016 census measured the population of the village as 101 people in 34 households.
