= Qalebi-ye Bala =

Village in Lorestan province, Iran

Qalebi-ye Bala Persian: قالبي بالا
- Village
- Location within Iran
- Coordinates: 33°28′24″N 47°56′15″E
- Country: Iran
- Province: Lorestan
- County: Chegeni
- District: Veysian
- Rural District: Veysian

Population (2016)
  - Total: 222
- Time zone: UTC+3:30 (IRST)

Qalebi-ye Bala (Persian: قالبي بالا) (Note: Also romanized as Qālebī-ye Bālā; formerly known as Qalebi-ye Olya (قالبي عليا), also romanized as Qālebī-ye ‘Olyā; also known as Qālebī) is a village in Veysian Rural District of Veysian District in Chegeni County, (Note: Formerly Dowreh County) Lorestan province, Iran.

== Demographics ==
=== Population ===
At the time of the 2006 National Census, the village's population, as Qalebi-ye Olya, was 392 in 97 households, when it was in Khorramabad County. The following census in 2011 counted 277 people in 78 households, by which time the district had been separated from the county in the establishment of Dowreh County. (Note: Renamed Chegeni County) The village was listed as Qalebi-ye Bala. The 2016 census measured the population of the village as 222 people in 76 households.
