= Dimah Mil Sofla =

Dimah Mil Sofla ديمه ميل سفلي
- Village
- Location within Iran
- Coordinates: 30°06′43″N 51°27′24″E
- Country: Iran
- Province: Fars
- County: Mamasani
- Bakhsh: Central
- Rural District: Bakesh-e Do

Population (2006)
  - Total: 126
- Time zone: UTC+3:30 (IRST)
  - Summer (DST): UTC+4:30 (IRDT)

Dimah Mil Sofla (Persian: ديمه ميل سفلي, also Romanized as Dīmah Mīl Soflá; also known as Dīmeh-ye Mīl-e Pā’īn) is a village in Bakesh-e Do Rural District, in the Central District of Mamasani County, Fars province, Iran. At the 2006 census, its population was 126, in 28 families.
