= Qalebi, Iran =

Village in Lorestan province, Iran

Qalebi Persian: قالبي
- Village
- Location within Iran
- Coordinates: 33°27′35″N 47°55′52″E
- Country: Iran
- Province: Lorestan
- County: Chegeni
- District: Veysian
- Rural District: Veysian

Population (2016)
  - Total: 391
- Time zone: UTC+3:30 (IRST)

Qalebi (Persian: قالبي) (Note: Also romanized as Qālebī; formerly known as Qalebi-ye Sofla (قالبي سفلي), also romanized as Qālebī-ye Soflá) is a village in Veysian Rural District of Veysian District in Chegeni County, (Note: Formerly Dowreh County) Lorestan province, Iran.

== Demographics ==
=== Population ===
At the time of the 2006 National Census, the village's population, as Qalebi-ye Sofla, was 425 in 110 households, when it was in Khorramabad County. The following census in 2011 counted 407 people in 116 households, by which time the district had been separated from the county in the establishment of Dowreh County. (Note: Renamed Chegeni County) The village was listed as Qalebi. The 2016 census measured the population of the village as 391 people in 124 households.
