= Gholaman-e Olya =

Village in Lorestan province, Iran

Gholaman-e Olya Persian: غلامان عليا
- Village
- Location within Iran
- Coordinates: 33°26′20″N 48°13′26″E
- Country: Iran
- Province: Lorestan
- County: Chegeni
- District: Veysian
- Rural District: Shurab

Population (2016)
  - Total: 87
- Time zone: UTC+3:30 (IRST)

Gholaman-e Olya (Persian: غلامان عليا) (Note: Also romanized as Gholāmān-e ‘Olyā; also known as Gholāmān) is a village in Shurab Rural District of Veysian District in Chegeni County, (Note: Formerly Dowreh County) Lorestan province, Iran.

== Demographics ==
=== Population ===
At the time of the 2006 National Census, the village's population was 122 in 27 households, when it was in Khorramabad County. The following census in 2011 counted 102 people in 23 households, by which time the district had been separated from the county in the establishment of Dowreh County. (Note: Renamed Chegeni County) The 2016 census measured the population of the village as 87 people in 26 households.
