= Karfaleh-ye Imanabad =

Village in Lorestan province, Iran

Karfaleh-ye Imanabad Persian: كرفله ايمان اباد
- Village
- Location within Iran
- Country: Iran
- Province: Lorestan
- County: Chegeni
- District: Veysian
- Rural District: Shurab

Population (2016)
  - Total: 16
- Time zone: UTC+3:30 (IRST)

Karfaleh-ye Imanabad (Persian: كرفله ايمان اباد) (Note: Also romanized as Kerfaleh-ye Īmānābād, Karfeleh-ye Imanabad, and Kerfeleh-ye Īmānābād; also known as Karfaleh, Karfaleh-ye Do, and Kerfeleh) is a village in Shurab Rural District of Veysian District in Chegeni County, (Note: Formerly Dowreh County) Lorestan province, Iran.

== Demographics ==
=== Population ===
At the time of the 2006 National Census, the village's population was 32 in nine households, when it was in Khorramabad County. The following census in 2011 counted 26 people in eight households, by which time the district had been separated from the county in the establishment of Dowreh County. (Note: Renamed Chegeni County) The 2016 census measured the population of the village as 16 people in seven households.
