= Cheshmeh Borjali =

Village in Lorestan province, Iran

Cheshmeh Borjali Persian: چشمه برج علي
- Village
- Location within Iran
- Coordinates: 33°28′27″N 48°00′04″E
- Country: Iran
- Province: Lorestan
- County: Chegeni
- District: Veysian
- Rural District: Veysian

Population (2016)
  - Total: 0
- Time zone: UTC+3:30 (IRST)

Cheshmeh Borjali (Persian: چشمه برج علي) (Note: Also romanized as Cheshmeh Borj‘alī and Cheshmeh-ye Borj 'Alī; also known as Dūl Kabūd) is a village in Veysian Rural District of Veysian District in Chegeni County, (Note: Formerly Dowreh County) Lorestan province, Iran.

== Demographics ==
=== Population ===
At the time of the 2006 National Census, the village's population was 47 in 12 households, when it was in Khorramabad County. The following census in 2011 counted 19 people in six households, by which time the district had been separated from the county in the establishment of Dowreh County. (Note: Renamed Chegeni County) The 2016 census measured the population of the village as zero.
