= Veysian Rural District =

Rural district in Lorestan province, Iran

Veysian Rural District Persian: دهستان ويسيان
- Rural District
- Location within Iran
- Coordinates: 33°28′34″N 47°57′30″E
- Country: Iran
- Province: Lorestan
- County: Chegeni
- District: Veysian
- Established: 1987
- Capital: Veysian

Population (2016)
  - Total: 4,943
- Time zone: UTC+3:30 (IRST)

Veysian Rural District (Persian: دهستان ويسيان) is in Veysian District of Chegeni County, (Note: Formerly Dowreh County) Lorestan province, Iran. It is administered from the city of Veysian. (Note: Formerly Mahmudvand)

== Demographics ==
=== Population ===
At the time of the 2006 National Census, the rural district's population (as a part of Khorramabad County) was 6,131 in 1,476 households. There were 5,797 inhabitants in 1,623 households at the following census of 2011, by which time the district had been separated from the county in the establishment of Dowreh County. (Note: Renamed Chegeni County) The 2016 census measured the population of the rural district as 4,943 in 1,624 households. The most populous of its 34 villages was Cham-e Divan, with 892 people.

=== Other villages in the rural district ===
- Abbasabad
- Abuzar
- Asar Zamin-e Kaliab
- Barikeh
- Cham Bagh-e Sofla
- Chenar-e Golaban-e Do
- Chenar-e Golaban-e Seh
- Cheshmeh Borjali
- Delbar-e Rok Rok
- Delbar Sadat-e Bala
- Delbar Sadat-e Pain
- Delbar Sadat-e Vosta
- Do Ab
- Farzali
- Golzar
- Hayat ol Gheyb
- Javanabad
- Kushki
- Movelah
- Pahalat
- Qalebi
- Qalebi-ye Bala
- Rostam Khan Judaki
- Sabzevar
- Tang-e Musa
- Zahrakar
- Zurandul
