= Pireh Sorkh-e Bala =

Pireh Sorkh-e Bala پيره سرخ بالا
- Village
- Location within Iran
- Coordinates: 30°10′35″N 51°16′46″E
- Country: Iran
- Province: Fars
- County: Mamasani
- Bakhsh: Central
- Rural District: Bakesh-e Do

Population (2006)
  - Total: 224
- Time zone: UTC+3:30 (IRST)
  - Summer (DST): UTC+4:30 (IRDT)

Pireh Sorkh-e Bala (Persian: پيره سرخ بالا, also Romanized as Pīreh Sorkh-e Bālā; also known as Pīr Sorkh and Pīr Sorkh-e Bālā) is a village in Bakesh-e Do Rural District, in the Central District of Mamasani County, Fars province, Iran. At the 2006 census, its population was 224, in 50 families.
