= Deh Gholaman, Badakhshan =

Village in Badakhshan Province, Afghanistan

Deh Gholaman Deh Gholāmān Yōr
- Location in Afghanistan
- Coordinates: 36°57′0″N 73°7′0″E
- Country: Afghanistan
- Province: Badakhshan Province
- District: Wakhan
- Time zone: + 4.30

Deh Gholaman is a village in Badakhshan Province in north-eastern Afghanistan on the Wakhan River, roughly 20 miles west of Baroghil.
