= Shur Ab-e Hezareh =

Shur Ab-e Hezareh شوراب هزاره
- Village
- Location within Iran
- Coordinates: 35°26′52″N 47°48′14″E
- Country: Iran
- Province: Kurdistan
- County: Qorveh
- Bakhsh: Serishabad
- Rural District: Lak

Population (2006)
  - Total: 309
- Time zone: UTC+3:30 (IRST)
  - Summer (DST): UTC+4:30 (IRDT)

Shur Ab-e Hezareh (Persian: شوراب هزاره, also Romanized as Shūr Āb-e Hezāreh, Shūrāb-e Hezāreh, and Shūrāb Hezāreh; also known as Shūrāb) is a village in Lak Rural District, Serishabad District, Qorveh County, Kurdistan Province, Iran. At the 2006 census, its population was 309, in 61 families. The village is populated by Kurds.
