= Shurab-e Madan Gach, Iran =

Village in Lorestan province, Iran

Shurab-e Madan Gach Persian: شوراب معدن گچ
- Village
- Location within Iran
- Coordinates: 33°24′03″N 48°11′33″E
- Country: Iran
- Province: Lorestan
- County: Chegeni
- District: Veysian
- Rural District: Shurab

Population (2016)
  - Total: 141
- Time zone: UTC+3:30 (IRST)

Shurab-e Madan Gach (Persian: شوراب معدن گچ) (Note: Also romanized as Shūrāb-e Maʿdan Gach; also known as Shūrāb-e Bālā, Shurab-e Olya (شوراب عليا), and Shūrāb-e ‘Olyā) is a village in Shurab Rural District of Veysian District in Chegeni County, (Note: Formerly Dowreh County) Lorestan province, Iran.

== Demographics ==
=== Population ===
At the time of the 2006 National Census, the village's population was 149 in 34 households, when it was in Khorramabad County. The following census in 2011 counted 128 people in 31 households, by which time the district had been separated from the county in the establishment of Dowreh County. (Note: Renamed Chegeni County) The 2016 census measured the population of the village as 141 people in 37 households.
