= Shurab-e Lor =

Shurab-e Lor شورابلر
- Village
- Location within Iran
- Coordinates: 30°10′10″N 51°20′37″E
- Country: Iran
- Province: Fars
- County: Mamasani
- Bakhsh: Central
- Rural District: Bakesh-e Do

Population (2006)
  - Total: 21
- Time zone: UTC+3:30 (IRST)
  - Summer (DST): UTC+4:30 (IRDT)

Shurab-e Lor (Persian: شورابلر, also Romanized as Shūrāb-e Lor and Shūr Āb-e Lor; also known as Shūr Āb and Shūrāb-e Bālā) is a village in Bakesh-e Do Rural District, in the Central District of Mamasani County, Fars province, Iran. At the 2006 census, its population was 21, in 5 families.
