= Shurab-e Zar =

Shurab-e Zar شوراب زار
- Village
- Location within Iran
- Coordinates: 30°10′13″N 51°20′30″E
- Country: Iran
- Province: Fars
- County: Mamasani
- Bakhsh: Central
- Rural District: Bakesh-e Do

Population (2006)
  - Total: 24
- Time zone: UTC+3:30 (IRST)
  - Summer (DST): UTC+4:30 (IRDT)

Shurab-e Zar (Persian: شوراب زار, also Romanized as Shūrāb-e Zār; also known as Shūrāb-e Lor and Shūrāb-e Pā’īn) is a village in Bakesh-e Do Rural District, in the Central District of Mamasani County, Fars province, Iran. At the 2006 census, its population was 24, in 6 families.
