= Shur Ab, Shiraz =

Shur Ab شوراب
- Village
- Location within Iran
- Coordinates: 29°15′18″N 52°19′47″E
- Country: Iran
- Province: Fars
- County: Shiraz
- Bakhsh: Central
- Rural District: Siyakh Darengun

Population (2006)
  - Total: 419
- Time zone: UTC+3:30 (IRST)
  - Summer (DST): UTC+4:30 (IRDT)

Shur Ab (Persian: شوراب, also Romanized as Shūr Āb and Shūrāb; also known as Sharāb Pāīn) is a village in Siyakh Darengun Rural District, in the Central District of Shiraz County, Fars province, Iran. At the 2006 census, its population was 419, in 96 families.
