= Shurab Khan =

Shurab Khan شوراب خان
- Village
- Location within Iran
- Coordinates: 35°19′52″N 47°42′22″E
- Country: Iran
- Province: Kurdistan
- County: Qorveh
- Bakhsh: Serishabad
- Rural District: Qaslan

Population (2006)
  - Total: 317
- Time zone: UTC+3:30 (IRST)
  - Summer (DST): UTC+4:30 (IRDT)

Shurab Khan (Persian: شوراب خان, also Romanized as Shūrāb Khān and Shūrāb-e Khān; also known as Shūrāb) is a village in Qaslan Rural District, Serishabad District, Qorveh County, Kurdistan Province, Iran. At the 2006 census, its population was 317, in 77 families. The village is populated by Kurds.
