= Shurab-e Mahmudvand =

Village in Lorestan province, Iran

Shurab-e Mahmudvand Persian: شوراب محمودوند
- Village
- Location within Iran
- Coordinates: 33°27′36″N 48°09′11″E
- Country: Iran
- Province: Lorestan
- County: Chegeni
- District: Veysian
- Rural District: Shurab

Population (2016)
  - Total: 341
- Time zone: UTC+3:30 (IRST)

Shurab-e Mahmudvand (Persian: شوراب محمودوند) (Note: Also romanized as Shūrāb-e Maḩmūdvand; also known as Maḩmūdvand and Shūrāb-e Moḩammadvand) is a village in Shurab Rural District of Veysian District in Chegeni County, (Note: Formerly Dowreh County) Lorestan province, Iran.

== Demographics ==
=== Population ===
At the time of the 2006 National Census, the village's population was 424 in 111 households, when it was in Khorramabad County. The following census in 2011 counted 340 people in 92 households, by which time the district had been separated from the county in the establishment of Dowreh County. (Note: Renamed Chegeni County) The 2016 census measured the population of the village as 341 people in 112 households.
