= Fərzalı =

Farzaly
- Azerbaijani: Fərzalı
- Location within Azerbaijan
- Coordinates: 40°38′16″N 45°27′22″E
- Country: Azerbaijan
- District: Gadabay
- Municipality: Arabachy
- Time zone: UTC+4 (AZT)
  - Summer (DST): UTC+5 (AZT)

Fərzalı (also, Farzaly) is a village in the Gadabay District of Azerbaijan. The village forms part of the municipality of Arabachy.
