= Shurab Rural District (Chegeni County) =

Rural district in Lorestan province, Iran

Shurab Rural District Persian: دهستان شوراب
- Rural District
- Location within Iran
- Coordinates: 33°26′N 48°09′E
- Country: Iran
- Province: Lorestan
- County: Chegeni
- District: Veysian
- Established: 1987
- Capital: Shurab-e Najm-e Soheyli

Population (2016)
  - Total: 4,251
- Time zone: UTC+3:30 (IRST)

Shurab Rural District (Persian: دهستان شوراب) is in Veysian District of Chegeni County, (Note: Formerly Dowreh County) Lorestan province, Iran. Its capital is the village of Shurab-e Najm-e Soheyli. (Note: Also known as Shurab-e Sofla)

== Demographics ==
=== Population ===
At the time of the 2006 National Census, the rural district's population (as a part of Khorramabad County) was 5,081 in 1,160 households. There were 4,413 inhabitants in 1,147 households at the following census of 2011, by which time the district had been separated from the county in the establishment of Dowreh County. (Note: Renamed Chegeni County) The 2016 census measured the population of the rural district as 4,251 in 1,280 households. The most populous of its 44 villages was Mineh, with 371 people.

=== Other villages in the rural district ===
- Benruteleh
- Bostan Rud Sharaf
- Chahar Gush
- Cham-e Vazir
- Darreh-ye Mohammad Qoli
- Gholaman-e Olya
- Gholaman-e Sofla
- Jafarabad
- Karfaleh
- Karfaleh-ye Imanabad
- Karfaleh-ye Lavan
- Kumas
- Lajam Gir
- Naqareh-ye Naveh Kesh
- Pol-e Shurab-e Bala
- Pol-e Shurab-e Pain
- Posht-e Tang-e Chenar
- Qaleh-ye Nashin Shahi
- Qaleh-ye Naveh Kesh
- Sarkaneh
- Sefid Dasht
- Shiran Bisheh
- Shurab-e Madan Gach
- Shurab-e Mahmudvand
- Tall-e Ajam
- Tall-e Amanollah
- Tall-e Mohammad Yusof
- Tall-e Morad Khani
- Tall-e Nemat
- Tall-e Salar
- Tayab
- Zahrakar-e Nesardeleh
- Zircheshmeh
