= Fərzili =

- Municipality
- Location within Azerbaijan
- Coordinates: 39°11′44″N 48°28′38″E
- Country: Azerbaijan
- Rayon: Jalilabad

Population
  - Total: 657
- Time zone: UTC+4 (AZT)
  - Summer (DST): UTC+5 (AZT)

Fərzili (also, Farzali, Fərzəli, Farzuli and Farzuly) is a village and municipality in the Jalilabad Rayon of Azerbaijan. It has a population of 657.
