= Shurab-e Khan Ali =

Shurab-e Khan Ali شوراب خانعلي
- Village
- Location within Iran
- Coordinates: 33°32′37″N 46°48′58″E
- Country: Iran
- Province: Ilam
- County: Sirvan
- Bakhsh: Central
- Rural District: Rudbar

Population (2006)
  - Total: 333
- Time zone: UTC+3:30 (IRST)
  - Summer (DST): UTC+4:30 (IRDT)

Shurab-e Khan Ali (Persian: شوراب خانعلي, also Romanized as Shūrāb-e Khān 'Alī, Shūrāb-e Khān'alī, and Shūr Āb-e Khān'alī) is a village in Rudbar Rural District, Central District, Sirvan County, Ilam Province, Iran. At the 2006 census, its population was 333, in 70 families. The village is populated by Kurds.
