= Shurab, Tus =

Shurab شوراب
- Village
- Location within Iran
- Coordinates: 36°29′47″N 59°32′39″E
- Country: Iran
- Province: Razavi Khorasan
- County: Mashhad
- Bakhsh: Central
- Rural District: Tus

Population (2006)
  - Total: 157
- Time zone: UTC+3:30 (IRST)
  - Summer (DST): UTC+4:30 (IRDT)

Shurab (Persian: شوراب, also Romanized as Shūrāb) is a village in Tus Rural District, in the Central District of Mashhad County, Razavi Khorasan Province, Iran. At the 2006 census, its population was 157, in 35 families.
