= Shur Ab, Chaharmahal and Bakhtiari =

Village in Chaharmahal and Bakhtiari, Iran

Shur Ab شوراب
- Village
- Location within Iran
- Coordinates: 31°16′03″N 51°07′43″E
- Country: Iran
- Province: Chaharmahal and Bakhtiari
- County: Lordegan
- Bakhsh: Falard
- Rural District: Poshtkuh

Population (2006)
  - Total: 264
- Time zone: UTC+3:30 (IRST)
  - Summer (DST): UTC+4:30 (IRDT)

Shur Ab (Persian: شوراب, also Romanized as Shūr Āb) is a village in Poshtkuh Rural District, Falard District, Lordegan County, Chaharmahal and Bakhtiari Province, Iran. At the 2006 census, its population was 264, in 46 families. The village is populated by Lurs.
