= Mahmudvand, Lorestan =

Mahmudvand محمودوند
- Village
- Location within Iran
- Coordinates: 33°29′25″N 48°01′59″E
- Country: Iran
- Province: Lorestan
- County: Khorramabad
- Bakhsh: Central
- Rural District: Dehpir-e Shomali

Population (2006)
  - Total: 43
- Time zone: UTC+3:30 (IRST)
  - Summer (DST): UTC+4:30 (IRDT)

Mahmudvand (Persian: محمودوند, also Romanized as Maḩmūdvand; also known as Godār-e Maḩmūd and Godār-e Maḩmūdvand) is a village in Dehpir-e Shomali Rural District, in the Central District of Khorramabad County, Lorestan Province, Iran. At the 2006 census, its population was 43, in 8 families.
