= Shurab, Rigan =

Shurab شوراب
- Village
- Location within Iran
- Coordinates: 28°11′19″N 58°53′25″E
- Country: Iran
- Province: Kerman
- County: Rigan
- Bakhsh: Central
- Rural District: Gavkan

Population (2006)
  - Total: 108
- Time zone: UTC+3:30 (IRST)
  - Summer (DST): UTC+4:30 (IRDT)

Shurab (Persian: شوراب, also Romanized as Shūrāb) is a village in Gavkan Rural District, in the Central District of Rigan County, Kerman Province, Iran. At the 2006 census, its population was 108, in 24 families.
