= Shurabad, Jiroft =

Shurabad شورآباد
- Village
- Location within Iran
- Coordinates: 28°47′58″N 57°11′51″E
- Country: Iran
- Province: Kerman
- County: Jiroft
- Bakhsh: Central
- Rural District: Esfandaqeh

Population (2006)
  - Total: 46
- Time zone: UTC+3:30 (IRST)
  - Summer (DST): UTC+4:30 (IRDT)

Shurabad (Persian: شورآباد, also Romanized as Shūrābād; also known as Shūr Āb) is a village in Esfandaqeh Rural District, in the Central District of Jiroft County, Kerman Province, Iran. At the 2006 census, its population was 46, in 9 families.
