= Shurab-e Hajji =

Shurab-e Hajji شوراب حاجي
- Village
- Location within Iran
- Coordinates: 35°18′06″N 47°41′43″E
- Country: Iran
- Province: Kurdistan
- County: Qorveh
- Bakhsh: Serishabad
- Rural District: Qaslan

Population (2006)
  - Total: 484
- Time zone: UTC+3:30 (IRST)
  - Summer (DST): UTC+4:30 (IRDT)

Shurab-e Hajji (Persian: شوراب حاجي, also Romanized as Shūrāb-e Ḩājjī; also known as Ḩājjī Shūrāb and Shūrāb) is a village in Qaslan Rural District, Serishabad District, Qorveh County, Kurdistan Province, Iran. At the 2006 census, its population was 484, in 110 families. The village is populated by Kurds.
