= Shurab-e Sofla, Fariman =

Shurab-e Sofla شوراب سفلي
- Village
- Location within Iran
- Coordinates: 35°52′20″N 59°35′13″E
- Country: Iran
- Province: Razavi Khorasan
- County: Fariman
- Bakhsh: Central
- Rural District: Sang Bast

Population (2006)
  - Total: 153
- Time zone: UTC+3:30 (IRST)
  - Summer (DST): UTC+4:30 (IRDT)

Shurab-e Sofla (Persian: شوراب سفلي, also Romanized as Shūrāb-e Soflá; also known as Shūrāb-e Pā’īn) is a village in Sang Bast Rural District, in the Central District of Fariman County, Razavi Khorasan Province, Iran. At the 2006 census, its population was 153, in 35 families.
