= Veysian =

City in Lorestan province, Iran

Veysian Persian: ويسيان
- City
- Location within Iran
- Coordinates: 33°29′09″N 48°01′50″E
- Country: Iran
- Province: Lorestan
- County: Chegeni
- District: Veysian
- Established as a city: 1999

Population (2016)
  - Total: 2,087
- Time zone: UTC+3:30 (IRST)

Veysian (Persian: ويسيان) (Note: Also romanized as Veysīān and Veysīyān; also known as Cham Bāgh-e Veysīān, Vaisiyan, Vaisyan, Vasīān, Veseyān, and Voisiyan; formerly known as Mahmudvand (محمودوند), also romanized as Maḩmūdvand) is a city in, and the capital of, Veysian District in Chegeni County, (Note: Formerly Dowreh County) Lorestan province, Iran. It also serves as the administrative center for Veysian Rural District. The village of Mahmudvand was converted to a city in 1999 and was renamed Veysian in 2007.

== Demographics ==
=== Population ===
At the time of the 2006 National Census, the city's population was 1,817 in 429 households, when it was in Khorramabad County. The following census in 2011 counted 1,988 people in 535 households, by which time the district had been separated from the county in the establishment of Dowreh County. (Note: Renamed Chegeni County) The 2016 census measured the population of the city as 2,087 people in 619 households.
