= Shurab-e Olya, Fariman =

Shurab-e Olya شوراب عليا
- Village
- Location within Iran
- Coordinates: 35°50′49″N 59°35′00″E
- Country: Iran
- Province: Razavi Khorasan
- County: Fariman
- Bakhsh: Central
- Rural District: Sang Bast

Population (2006)
  - Total: 84
- Time zone: UTC+3:30 (IRST)
  - Summer (DST): UTC+4:30 (IRDT)

Shurab-e Olya (Persian: شوراب عليا, also Romanized as Shūrāb-e ‘Olyā; also known as Shūrāb-e Bālā) is a village in Sang Bast Rural District, in the Central District of Fariman County, Razavi Khorasan Province, Iran. At the 2006 census, its population was 84, in 22 families.
