= Bala Jam Rural District =

Rural district in Razavi Khorasan province, Iran

Bala Jam Rural District Persian: دهستان بالاجام
- Rural District
- Location within Iran
- Coordinates: 35°25′N 60°18′E
- Country: Iran
- Province: Razavi Khorasan
- County: Torbat-e Jam
- District: Nasrabad
- Established: 1987
- Capital: Nasrabad

Population (2016)
  - Total: 12,243
- Time zone: UTC+3:30 (IRST)

Bala Jam Rural District (Persian: دهستان بالاجام) is in Nasrabad District of Torbat-e Jam County, Razavi Khorasan province, Iran. It is administered from the city of Nasrabad.

== Demographics ==
=== Population ===
At the time of the 2006 National Census, the rural district's population was 11,412 in 2,591 households. There were 11,723 inhabitants in 3,100 households at the following census of 2011. The 2016 census measured the population of the rural district as 12,243 in 3,372 households. The most populous of its 20 villages was Abdalabad, with 2,296 people.

=== Other villages in the rural district ===
- Jafarabad
- Kalateh-ye Bozorg
- Kalateh-ye Fazel
- Kalateh-ye Sufi
- Khorramabad
- Qaleh-ye Sorkh
- Taqiabad
