= Karizan Rural District =

Rural district in Razavi Khorasan province, Iran

Karizan Rural District Persian: دهستان كاريزان
- Rural District
- Location within Iran
- Coordinates: 35°31′N 60°15′E
- Country: Iran
- Province: Razavi Khorasan
- County: Torbat-e Jam
- District: Nasrabad
- Established: 1995
- Capital: Kariz-e Now

Population (2016)
  - Total: 20,737
- Time zone: UTC+3:30 (IRST)

Karizan Rural District (Persian: دهستان كاريزان) is in Nasrabad District of Torbat-e Jam County, Razavi Khorasan province, Iran. Its capital is the village of Kariz-e Now.

== Demographics ==
=== Population ===
At the time of the 2006 National Census, the rural district's population was 19,182 in 4,444 households. There were 20,765 inhabitants in 5,523 households at the following census of 2011. The 2016 census measured the population of the rural district as 20,737 in 5,900 households. The most populous of its 21 villages was Samangan, with 6,299 people.

=== Other villages in the rural district ===
- Aliabad
- Hasanabad
- Kheyrabad
- Momenabad
- Qaleh Shir
- Samakhun
