= Bakesh-e Do Rural District =

Rural district in Fars province, Iran

Bakesh-e Do Rural District Persian: دهستان بكش دو
- Rural District
- Location within Iran
- Coordinates: 30°10′15″N 51°19′48″E
- Country: Iran
- Province: Fars
- County: Mamasani
- District: Central
- Capital: Ahangari

Population (2016)
  - Total: 5,271
- Time zone: UTC+3:30 (IRST)

Bakesh-e Do Rural District (Persian: دهستان بكش دو) is in the Central District of Mamasani County, Fars province, Iran. Its capital is the village of Ahangari.

== Demographics ==
=== Population ===
At the time of the 2006 National Census, the rural district's population was 6,625 in 1,391 households. There were 5,483 inhabitants in 1,435 households at the following census of 2011. The 2016 census measured the population of the rural district as 5,271 in 1,631 households. The most populous of its 45 villages was Ahangari, with 871 people.
