= Nasrabad District =

District in Razavi Khorasan province, Iran

Nasrabad District Persian: بخش نصرآباد
- District
- Location within Iran
- Coordinates: 35°28′N 60°15′E
- Country: Iran
- Province: Razavi Khorasan
- County: Torbat-e Jam
- Established: 1995
- Capital: Nasrabad

Population (2016)
  - Total: 40,440
- Time zone: UTC+3:30 (IRST)

Nasrabad District (Persian: بخش نصرآباد) is in Torbat-e Jam County, Razavi Khorasan province, Iran. Its capital is the city of Nasrabad.

== Demographics ==
=== Population ===
At the time of the 2006 National Census, the district's population was 37,429 in 8,634 households. The following census in 2011 counted 40,245 people in 10,638 households. The 2016 census measured the population of the district as 40,440 inhabitants in 11,297 households.

=== Administrative divisions ===
Nasrabad District Population
Administrative Divisions	2006	2011	2016
Bala Jam RD	11,412	11,723	12,243
Karizan RD	19,182	20,765	20,737
Nasrabad (city)	6,835	7,757	7,460
Total	37,429	40,245	40,440
RD = Rural District
