= Veysian District =

District in Lorestan province, Iran

Veysian District Persian: بخش ویسیان
- District
- Location within Iran
- Coordinates: 33°27′N 48°01′E
- Country: Iran
- Province: Lorestan
- County: Chegeni
- Capital: Veysian

Population (2016)
  - Total: 11,281
- Time zone: UTC+3:30 (IRST)

Veysian District (Persian: بخش ویسیان) is in Chegeni County, (Note: Formerly Dowreh County) Lorestan province, Iran. Its capital is the city of Veysian.

== History ==
In 2007, the district was separated from Khorramabad County in the establishment of Dowreh County. (Note: Renamed Chegeni County)

== Demographics ==
=== Population ===
At the time of the 2006 National Census, the district's population (as a part of Khorramabad County) was 13,029 in 3,065 households. The following census in 2011 counted 12,198 people in 3,305 households. The 2016 census measured the population of the district as 11,281 inhabitants in 3,523 households.

=== Administrative divisions ===
Veysian District Population (Note: As a part of Khorramabad County at the 2006 census)
Administrative Divisions	2006	2011	2016
Shurab RD	5,081	4,413	4,251
Veysian RD	6,131	5,797	4,943
Veysian (city) (Note: Formerly Mahmudvand)	1,817	1,988	2,087
Total	13,029	12,198	11,281
RD = Rural District

== Economy ==
Outside the city of Veysian, the district is primarily agricultural. It is famous for its rice farms, and its other farms also produce vegetables.
