= Darreh Bideyeneh =

Village in Chaharmahal and Bakhtiari province, Iran

Darreh Bideyeneh Persian: دره بيدينه
- Village
- Location within Iran
- Coordinates: 32°21′36″N 50°25′33″E
- Country: Iran
- Province: Chaharmahal and Bakhtiari
- County: Farsan
- District: Babaheydar
- Rural District: Sarab-e Olya

Population (2016)
  - Total: 175
- Time zone: UTC+3:30 (IRST)

Darreh Bideyeneh (Persian: دره بيدينه) (Note: Also romanized as Darreh Bīdeyeneh) is a village in Sarab-e Olya Rural District of Babaheydar District in Farsan County, Chaharmahal and Bakhtiari province, Iran.

== Demographics ==
=== Ethnicity ===
The village is populated by Lurs.

=== Population ===
At the time of the 2006 National Census, the village's population was 159 in 23 households, when it was in Mizdej-e Olya Rural District of the Central District. The following census in 2011 counted 159 people in 28 households, by which time the village had been separated from the district in the formation of Babaheydar District. Darreh Bideyeneh was transferred to Sarab-e Olya Rural District created in the new district. The 2016 census measured the population of the village as 175 people in 39 households.
