= Rastab =

Village in Chaharmahal and Bakhtiari province, Iran

Rastab Persian: راستاب
- Village
- Location within Iran
- Coordinates: 32°12′51″N 50°37′52″E
- Country: Iran
- Province: Chaharmahal and Bakhtiari
- County: Farsan
- District: Junqan
- Rural District: Junqan

Population (2016)
  - Total: 1,582
- Time zone: UTC+3:30 (IRST)

Rastab (Persian: راستاب) (Note: Also romanized as Rāstāb; also known as Rāstābād) is a village in, and the capital of, Junqan Rural District in Junqan District of Farsan County, Chaharmahal and Bakhtiari province, Iran.

== Demographics ==
=== Ethnicity ===
The village is populated by Lurs.

=== Population ===
At the time of the 2006 National Census, the village's population was 1,676 in 376 households, when it was in Mizdej-e Sofla Rural District of the Central District. The following census in 2011 counted 1,715 people in 470 households, by which time the rural district had been separated from the district in the formation of Junqan District. Rastab was transferred to Junqan Rural District created in the new district. The 2016 census measured the population of the village as 1,582 people in 453 households. It was the most populous village in its rural district.
