= Sharifabad, Chaharmahal and Bakhtiari =

Village in Chaharmahal and Bakhtiari province, Iran

Sharifabad Persian: شريف اباد
- Village
- Location within Iran
- Coordinates: 32°21′12″N 50°26′33″E
- Country: Iran
- Province: Chaharmahal and Bakhtiari
- County: Farsan
- District: Babaheydar
- Rural District: Sarab-e Olya

Population (2016)
  - Total: 175
- Time zone: UTC+3:30 (IRST)

Sharifabad (Persian: شريف اباد) (Note: Also romanized as Sharīfābād) is a village in, and the capital of, Sarab-e Olya Rural District in Babaheydar District of Farsan County, Chaharmahal and Bakhtiari province, Iran.

== Demographics ==
=== Ethnicity ===
The village is populated by Lurs.

=== Population ===
At the time of the 2006 National Census, the village's population was 257 in 50 households, when it was in Mizdej-e Olya Rural District of the Central District. The following census in 2011 counted 209 people in 53 households, by which time the village had been separated from the district in the formation of Babaheydar District. Sharifabad was transferred to Sarab-e Olya Rural District created in the new district. The 2016 census measured the population of the village as 175 people in 50 households.
