= Gusheh, Farsan =

Village in Chaharmahal and Bakhtiari province, Iran

Gusheh Persian: گوشه
- Village
- Location within Iran
- Coordinates: 32°11′21″N 50°36′45″E
- Country: Iran
- Province: Chaharmahal and Bakhtiari
- County: Farsan
- District: Junqan
- Rural District: Junqan

Population (2016)
  - Total: 907
- Time zone: UTC+3:30 (IRST)

Gusheh (Persian: گوشه) (Note: Also romanized as Gūsheh) is a village in Junqan Rural District of Junqan District in Farsan County, Chaharmahal and Bakhtiari province, Iran.

== Demographics ==
=== Ethnicity ===
The village is populated by Lurs.

=== Population ===
At the time of the 2006 National Census, the village's population was 952 in 227 households, when it was in Mizdej-e Sofla Rural District of the Central District. The following census in 2011 counted 915 people in 260 households, by which time the rural district had been separated from the district in the formation of Junqan District. Gusheh was transferred to Junqan Rural District created in the new district. The 2016 census measured the population of the village as 907 people in 280 households.
