= Sepid Daneh =

Village in Chaharmahal and Bakhtiari province, Iran

Sepid Daneh Persian: سپيدانه
- Village
- Location within Iran
- Coordinates: 32°19′45″N 50°24′47″E
- Country: Iran
- Province: Chaharmahal and Bakhtiari
- County: Farsan
- District: Babaheydar
- Rural District: Sarab-e Olya

Population (2016)
  - Total: 168
- Time zone: UTC+3:30 (IRST)

Sepid Daneh (Persian: سپيدانه) (Note: Also romanized as Sepīd Dāneh; also known as Sefīd Dāneh) is a village in Sarab-e Olya Rural District of Babaheydar District in Farsan County, Chaharmahal and Bakhtiari province, Iran.

== Demographics ==
=== Ethnicity ===
The village is populated by Lurs.

=== Population ===
At the time of the 2006 National Census, the village's population was 340 in 59 households, when it was in Mizdej-e Olya Rural District of the Central District. The following census in 2011 counted 273 people in 58 households, by which time the village had been separated from the district in the formation of Babaheydar District. Sepid Daneh was transferred to Sarab-e Olya Rural District created in the new district. The 2016 census measured the population of the village as 168 people in 47 households.
