= Chagha Hast =

Village in Chaharmahal and Bakhtiari province, Iran

Chagha Hast Persian: چغاهست
- Village
- Location within Iran
- Coordinates: 32°11′39″N 50°37′20″E
- Country: Iran
- Province: Chaharmahal and Bakhtiari
- County: Farsan
- District: Junqan
- Rural District: Junqan

Population (2016)
  - Total: 261
- Time zone: UTC+3:30 (IRST)

Chagha Hast (Persian: چغاهست) (Note: Also romanized as Chaghā Hast; also known as Chaqāhast, Cheqā Hast, and Cheqāhast) is a village in Junqan Rural District of Junqan District in Farsan County, Chaharmahal and Bakhtiari province, Iran.

== Demographics ==
=== Ethnicity ===
The village is populated by Lurs.

=== Population ===
At the time of the 2006 National Census, the village's population was 352 in 73 households, when it was in Mizdej-e Sofla Rural District of the Central District. The following census in 2011 counted 310 people in 86 households, by which time the rural district had been separated from the district in the formation of Junqan District. Chagha Hast was transferred to Junqan Rural District created in the new district. The 2016 census measured the population of the village as 261 people in 83 households.
