= Kavanak =

Village in Chaharmahal and Bakhtiari province, Iran

Kavanak Persian: كوانك
- Village
- Location within Iran
- Coordinates: 32°20′43″N 50°24′30″E
- Country: Iran
- Province: Chaharmahal and Bakhtiari
- County: Farsan
- District: Babaheydar
- Rural District: Sarab-e Olya

Population (2016)
  - Total: 257
- Time zone: UTC+3:30 (IRST)

Kavanak (Persian: كوانك) (Note: Also romanized as Kavānak) is a village in Sarab-e Olya Rural District of Babaheydar District in Farsan County, Chaharmahal and Bakhtiari province, Iran.

== Demographics ==
=== Ethnicity ===
The village is populated by Lurs.

=== Population ===
At the time of the 2006 National Census, the village's population was 339 in 63 households, when it was in Mizdej-e Olya Rural District of the Central District. The following census in 2011 counted 276 people in 61 households, by which time the village had been separated from the district in the formation of Babaheydar District. Kavanak was transferred to Sarab-e Olya Rural District created in the new district. The 2016 census measured the population of the village as 257 people in 64 households. It was the most populous village in its rural district.
