= Isaabad, Chaharmahal and Bakhtiari =

Village in Chaharmahal and Bakhtiari province, Iran

Isaabad Persian: عيسي اباد
- Village
- Location within Iran
- Coordinates: 32°16′43″N 50°31′10″E
- Country: Iran
- Province: Chaharmahal and Bakhtiari
- County: Farsan
- District: Babaheydar
- Rural District: Sarab-e Sofla

Population (2016)
  - Total: 1,757
- Time zone: UTC+3:30 (IRST)

Isaabad (Persian: عيسي اباد) (Note: Also romanized as ‘Īsáābād) is a village in, and the capital of, Sarab-e Sofla Rural District in Babaheydar District of Farsan County, Chaharmahal and Bakhtiari province, Iran. The previous capital of the rural district was the village of Filabad, now a city.

== Demographics ==
=== Ethnicity ===
The village is populated by Lurs.

=== Population ===
At the time of the 2006 National Census, the village's population was 1,907 in 435 households, when it was in Mizdej-e Olya Rural District of the Central District. The following census in 2011 counted 1,923 people in 566 households, by which time the village had been separated from the district in the formation of Babaheydar District. Isaabad was transferred to Sarab-e Sofla Rural District created in the new district. The 2016 census measured the population of the village as 1,757 people in 462 households.
