= Karan, Chaharmahal and Bakhtiari =

Village in Chaharmahal and Bakhtiari province, Iran

Karan Persian: كران
- Village
- Location within Iran
- Coordinates: 32°13′41″N 50°35′42″E
- Country: Iran
- Province: Chaharmahal and Bakhtiari
- County: Farsan
- District: Junqan
- Rural District: Mizdej-e Sofla

Population (2016)
  - Total: 4,049
- Time zone: UTC+3:30 (IRST)

Karan (Persian: كُران) (Note: Also romanized as Korān) is a village in Mizdej-e Sofla Rural District of Junqan District in Farsan County, Chaharmahal and Bakhtiari province, Iran.

== Demographics ==
=== Ethnicity ===
The village is populated by Lurs.

=== Population ===
At the time of the 2006 National Census, the village's population was 4,227 in 955 households, when it was in the Central District. The following census in 2011 counted 4,345 people in 1,240 households, by which time the rural district had been separated from the district in the formation of Junqan District. The 2016 census measured the population of the village as 4,049 people in 1,193 households. It was the only village in its rural district.
