= Junqan Rural District =

Rural district in Chaharmahal and Bakhtiari province, Iran

Junqan Rural District Persian: دهستان جونقان
- Rural District
- Location within Iran
- Coordinates: 32°08′N 50°40′E
- Country: Iran
- Province: Chaharmahal and Bakhtiari
- County: Farsan
- District: Junqan
- Established: 2011
- Capital: Rastab

Population (2016)
  - Total: 2,750
- Time zone: UTC+3:30 (IRST)

Junqan Rural District (Persian: دهستان جونقان) is in Junqan District of Farsan County, Chaharmahal and Bakhtiari province, Iran. Its capital is the village of Rastab.

== History ==
In 2011, Mizdej-e Sofla Rural District and the city of Junqan were separated from the Central District in the formation of Junqan District, and Junqan Rural District was created in the new district.

== Demographics ==
=== Population ===
At the time of the 2011 census, the rural district's population was 1,225 inhabitants in 346 households. The 2016 census measured the population of the rural district as 2,750 in 816 households. The most populous of its four villages was Rastab, with 1,582 people.

=== Other villages in the rural district ===
- Chagha Hast
- Gusheh
