= Nasirabad-e Galeh =

Nasirabad-e Galeh نصيراباد گله
- Village
- Location within Iran
- Coordinates: 32°21′51″N 50°25′22″E
- Country: Iran
- Province: Chaharmahal and Bakhtiari
- County: Farsan
- Bakhsh: Central
- Rural District: Mizdej-e Olya

Population (2006)
  - Total: 24
- Time zone: UTC+3:30 (IRST)
  - Summer (DST): UTC+4:30 (IRDT)

Nasirabad-e Galeh (Persian: نصيراباد گله, also Romanized as Naşīrābād-e Galeh) is a village in Mizdej-e Olya Rural District, in the Central District of Farsan County, Chaharmahal and Bakhtiari Province, Iran. At the 2006 census, its population was 24, in 4 families. The village is populated by Lurs.
