= Hajjiabad, Farsan =

Hajjiabad حاجي اباد
- Village
- Location within Iran
- Coordinates: 32°20′58″N 50°26′19″E
- Country: Iran
- Province: Chaharmahal and Bakhtiari
- County: Farsan
- Bakhsh: Central
- Rural District: Mizdej-e Olya

Population (2006)
  - Total: 82
- Time zone: UTC+3:30 (IRST)
  - Summer (DST): UTC+4:30 (IRDT)

Hajjiabad (Persian: حاجي اباد, also Romanized as Ḩājjīābād) is a village in Mizdej-e Olya Rural District, in the Central District of Farsan County, Chaharmahal and Bakhtiari province, Iran. At the 2006 census, its population was 82, in 13 families. The village is populated by Lurs.
