= Deh Cheshmeh =

Village in Chaharmahal and Bakhtiari province, Iran

Deh Cheshmeh Persian: ده چشمه
- Village
- Location within Iran
- Coordinates: 32°13′31″N 50°33′17″E
- Country: Iran
- Province: Chaharmahal and Bakhtiari
- County: Farsan
- District: Central
- Rural District: Mizdej-e Olya

Population (2016)
  - Total: 4,510
- Time zone: UTC+3:30 (IRST)

Deh Cheshmeh (Persian: ده چشمه) (Note: Also romanized as Dah Cheshmeh) is a village in Mizdej-e Olya Rural District of the Central District in Farsan County, Chaharmahal and Bakhtiari province, Iran.

== Demographics ==
=== Ethnicity ===
The village is populated by Lurs.

=== Population ===
At the time of the 2006 National Census, the village's population was 4,699 in 989 households, when it was in Mizdej-e Sofla Rural District. The following census in 2011 counted 4,795 people in 1,225 households, by which time the village had been transferred to Mizdej-e Olya Rural District. The 2016 census measured the population of the village as 4,510 people in 1,229 households. It was the most populous village in its rural district.

== See also ==
- Tappe Bardnakoon
