= Tappeh Berdankan =

- تپه بردنکان (Persian)
- Location of Tappeh Berdankan in Iran
- 32°12′40″N 50°34′15″E
- Type: Archaeological site
- Periods: Sasanian, Parthian, Achaemenid, Elamite, and Chalcolithic
- Location: Mizdej-e Sofla Rural District of Junqan District, Farsan County, Chaharmahal and Bakhtiari province, Iran
- Region: Gay Province
- Part of: Rāwar-kust-ī-rōdbār Canton

Site notes
- Archaeologists: Alireza Khosrowzadeh
- Discovered: 1986
- Management: Cultural Heritage of Chaharmahal and Bakhtiari

Designations
- Designation: National monument No. 19527

Tappeh Berdankan (Persian: تپه بردنکان) (Note: Also romanized as Tappe Bardnakoon) is an archaeological site in Farsan County, Chaharmahal and Bakhtiari province, Iran. It is c. 2.4 kilometers southeast of the village of Deh Cheshmeh, near the southern shore of the Pireghar River.

It is mainly a Sasanian site, although some pottery from the Parthian, Achaemenid, Elamite, and Chalcolithic periods was also found in a few spots. During the late Sasanian era, the site now known as Tappeh Berdankan was part of the canton of Rāwar-kust-ī-rōdbār and served as the administrative centre of the province of Gay.

It provided for interactions between different provinces of Eranshahr, in particular Gay in Spahan, Ram-Ohrmazd, Ormazd-Ardashir, and Weh-Andiyok-Shapur in Khuzistan, and Ig in Pars.

The site was illegally excavated and looted in the past, and thus only a minor part remains undamaged. In 2016, the Cultural Heritage of Chaharmahal and Bakhtiari mapped the site boundaries and stated that the area would be monitored around the clock by the Protection Unit of the General Administration.

Professional, government-approved excavations in 2017 and 2018 led to the excavation of many Sasanian-era items, including 559 clay bullae, among them administrative bullae.

== Sources ==
- Khosrowzadeh, Alireza; Norouzi, Aliashgar; Gyselen, Rika; Habibi, Hossein (2020). "Administrative Bullae from Tappe Bardnakoon, a Newly Found Late Sasanian Administrative Centre". Iranica Antiqua. 55: 165–220. doi:10.2143/IA.55.0.3289195.
