= Junqan Castle =

Castle in Chaharmahal and Bakhtiari Province, Iran

Junqan castle
- قلعه جونقان
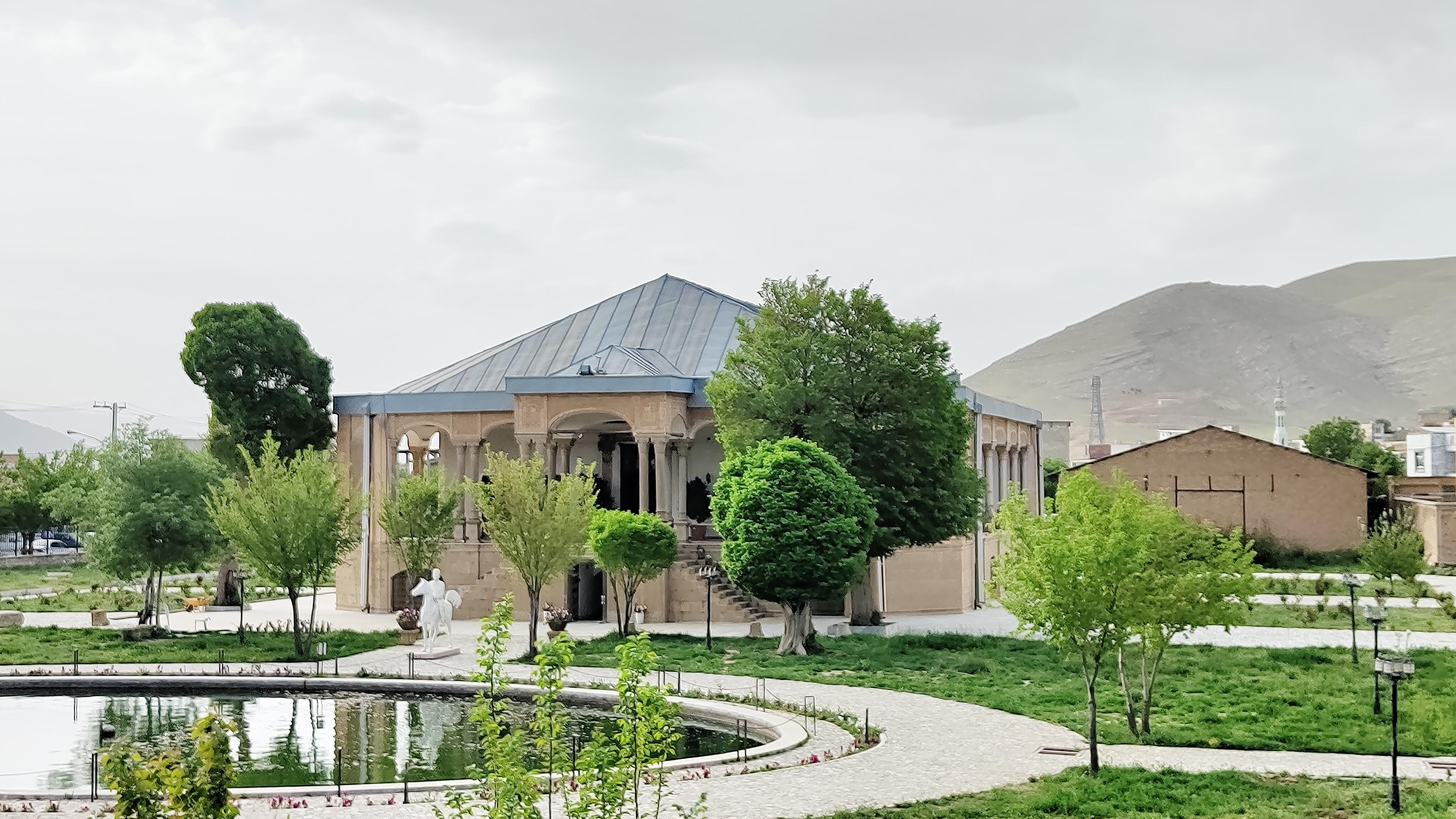

General information
- Type: Castle
- Location: Junqan, Iran

Junqan castle (Persian: قلعه جونقان) is a historical castle located in Farsan County in Chaharmahal and Bakhtiari Province, The longevity of this fortress dates back to the Qajar dynasty.
