= Chubin, Chaharmahal and Bakhtiari =

Village in Chaharmahal and Bakhtiari province, Iran

Chubin Persian: چوبين
- Village
- Location within Iran
- Coordinates: 32°18′17″N 50°32′47″E
- Country: Iran
- Province: Chaharmahal and Bakhtiari
- County: Farsan
- District: Central
- Rural District: Mizdej-e Olya

Population (2016)
  - Total: 143
- Time zone: UTC+3:30 (IRST)

Chubin (Persian: چوبين) (Note: Also romanized as Chūbīn) is a village in Mizdej-e Olya Rural District of the Central District in Farsan County, Chaharmahal and Bakhtiari province, Iran.

== Demographics ==
=== Ethnicity ===
The village is populated by Lurs.

=== Population ===
At the time of the 2006 National Census, the village's population was 127 in 25 households. The following census in 2011 counted 127 people in 34 households. The 2016 census measured the population of the village as 143 people in 38 households.
