= Chaharmahali Turks =

Turkic ethnic group living in Iran

چهارمحال تۆرکلری

Total population
- 390,000 (est.)

Regions with significant populations
- Saman, Ben, Shahrekord, Borujen and Farsan counties

Languages
- Chaharmahali Turkic; Qashqai, Persian

Religion
- Shia Islam

Related ethnic groups
- Other Turkic peoples (especially Qashqai)

Chaharmahali Turks (چهارمحال تۆرکلری Çəharməhal Türkləri) are a Turkic people who live in the Chaharmahal region of Iran and speak Chaharmahali Turkic.

== Tribes and dialects ==
The majority of Chaharmahal Turks are from the Qashqai tribal confederation. The Chaharmahali Turks who are not Qashqai are part of Dareshuri, Nefer, Baharlu, Seljuq, Inallu, Qizilbash, Bayat, Afshar, Khalaj or Belwardi tribes.

The majority of Chaharmahali Turks speak Qashqai and Chaharmahali Turkic (both Oghuz languages), as well as Persian—the official language of Iran.

== Demographics ==
Chaharmahal Turks comprise 12.1% of the population of Chaharmahal and Bakhtiari province, and about 30% of the population of Chaharmahal region itself. The majority of their population is in the counties of Saman, Ben, Shahrekord, Borujen and Farsan. They are Shia Muslims.
