= Filabad =

City in Chaharmahal and Bakhtiari province, Iran

Filabad Persian: فيل اباد
- City
- Location within Iran
- Coordinates: 32°18′08″N 50°29′53″E
- Country: Iran
- Province: Chaharmahal and Bakhtiari
- County: Farsan
- District: Babaheydar
- Established as a city: 2019

Population (2016)
  - Total: 4,656
- Time zone: UTC+3:30 (IRST)

Filabad (Persian: فيل اباد) (Note: Also romanized as Fīlābād) is a city in Babaheydar District of Farsan County, Chaharmahal and Bakhtiari province, Iran. As a village, it served as the capital of Sarab-e Sofla Rural District until its capital was transferred to the village of Isaabad.

== Demographics ==
=== Ethnicity ===
The city is populated by Lurs.

=== Population ===
At the time of the 2006 National Census, Filabad's population was 4,713 in 1,032 households, when it was a village in Mizdej-e Olya Rural District of the Central District. The following census in 2011 counted 5,224 people in 1,408 households, by which time the village had been separated from the district in the establishment of Babaheydar District. Filabad was transferred to Sarab-e Sofla Rural District created in the new district. The 2016 census measured the population of the village as 4,656 people in 1,401 households. It was the most populous village in its rural district.

Filabad was converted to a city in 2019.
