= Omidabad, Chaharmahal and Bakhtiari =

Omidabad اميداباد
- Village
- Location within Iran
- Coordinates: 32°19′25″N 50°25′57″E
- Country: Iran
- Province: Chaharmahal and Bakhtiari
- County: Farsan
- Bakhsh: Central
- Rural District: Mizdej-e Olya

Population (2006)
  - Total: 153
- Time zone: UTC+3:30 (IRST)
  - Summer (DST): UTC+4:30 (IRDT)

Omidabad (Persian: اميداباد, also Romanized as Omīdābād and Ommīdābād; also known as Ommīdābād-e Sarāb) is a village in Mizdej-e Olya Rural District, in the Central District of Farsan County, Chaharmahal and Bakhtiari Province, Iran. At the 2006 census, its population was 153, in 25 families. The village is populated by Lurs.
