= Bid Gol, Chaharmahal and Bakhtiari =

Village in Chaharmahal and Bakhtiari province, Iran

Bid Gol Persian: بيدگل
- Village
- Location within Iran
- Coordinates: 32°16′14″N 50°28′35″E
- Country: Iran
- Province: Chaharmahal and Bakhtiari
- County: Farsan
- District: Central
- Rural District: Mizdej-e Olya

Population (2016)
  - Total: 157
- Time zone: UTC+3:30 (IRST)

Bid Gol (Persian: بيدگل) (Note: Also romanized as Bīd Gol) is a village in Mizdej-e Olya Rural District of the Central District in Farsan County, Chaharmahal and Bakhtiari province, Iran.

== Demographics ==
=== Ethnicity ===
The village is populated by Lurs.

=== Population ===
At the time of the 2006 National Census, the village's population was 174 in 35 households. The following census in 2011 counted 90 people in 26 households. The 2016 census measured the population of the village as 157 people in 45 households.
