= Sarab-e Olya Rural District =

Rural district in Chaharmahal and Bakhtiari province, Iran

Sarab-e Olya Rural District Persian: دهستان سراب عليا
- Rural District
- Location within Iran
- Coordinates: 32°20′N 50°25′E
- Country: Iran
- Province: Chaharmahal and Bakhtiari
- County: Farsan
- District: Babaheydar
- Established: 2011
- Capital: Sharifabad

Population (2016)
  - Total: 1,302
- Time zone: UTC+3:30 (IRST)

Sarab-e Olya Rural District (Persian: دهستان سراب عليا) is in Babaheydar District of Farsan County, Chaharmahal and Bakhtiari province, Iran. Its capital is the village of Sharifabad.

== History ==
In 2011, villages were separated from the Central District in the formation of Babaheydar District, and Sarab-e Olya Rural District was created in the new district.

== Demographics ==
=== Population ===
At the time of the 2011 National Census, the rural district's population was 1,623 inhabitants in 369 households. The 2016 census measured the population of the rural district as 1,302 in 339 households. The most populous of its 14 villages was Kavanak, with 257 people.

=== Other villages in the rural district ===
- Darreh Bideyeneh
- Qaleh-ye Omidabad
- Sepid Daneh
