= Sarab-e Sofla Rural District =

Rural district in Chaharmahal and Bakhtiari province, Iran

Sarab-e Sofla Rural District Persian: دهستان سراب سفلي
- Rural District
- Location within Iran
- Coordinates: 32°18′N 50°28′E
- Country: Iran
- Province: Chaharmahal and Bakhtiari
- County: Farsan
- District: Babaheydar
- Established: 2011
- Capital: Isaabad

Population (2016)
  - Total: 6,413
- Time zone: UTC+3:30 (IRST)

Sarab-e Sofla Rural District (Persian: دهستان سراب سفلي) is in Babaheydar District of Farsan County, Chaharmahal and Bakhtiari province, Iran. Its capital is the village of Isaabad. The previous capital of the rural district was the village of Filabad, now a city.

== History ==
In 2011, villages were separated from the Central District in the formation of Babaheydar District, and Sarab-e Sofla Rural District was created in the new district.

== Demographics ==
=== Population ===
At the time of the 2011 National Census, the rural district's population was 7,147 inhabitants in 1,974 households. The 2016 census measured the population of the rural district as 6,413 in 1,863 households. The most populous of its three villages was Filabad (now a city), with 4,656 people.
