= Mizdej =

Mizdej (Persian: ميزدج) may refer to:

- Mizdej-e Olya Rural District
- Mizdej-e Sofla Rural District
