= Pardanjan =

City in Chaharmahal and Bakhtiari province, Iran

Pardanjan Persian: پردنجان
- City
- Location within Iran
- Coordinates: 32°15′14″N 50°35′51″E
- Country: Iran
- Province: Chaharmahal and Bakhtiari
- County: Farsan
- District: Junqan
- Established as a city: 2011

Population (2016)
  - Total: 8,699
- Time zone: UTC+3:30 (IRST)

Pardanjan (Persian: پردنجان) (Note: Also romanized as Pardanjān, Pardenjān, and Pordanjān; also known as Vardanjān) is a city in Junqan District of Farsan County, Chaharmahal and Bakhtiari province, Iran.

== Demographics ==
=== Ethnicity ===
The city is populated by Lurs.

=== Population ===
At the time of the 2006 National Census, Pardanjan's population was 7,370 in 1,624 households, when it was a village in Mizdej-e Sofla Rural District of the Central District. The following census in 2011 counted 8,088 people in 1,246 households, by which time the rural district had been separated from the district in the formation of Junqan District, and the village had been elevated to the status of a city. The 2016 census measured the population of the city as 8,699 people in 2,364 households.
