= Travelogue of Haj Ayaz Khan Qashqai =

This travelogue is written by Haj Ayaz Khan, one of Qashqai khans. The Travel has happened in 1922 (April to December), from Iran to Saudi Arabia and Iraq in order to visit Islamic holly places.

== Importance ==
This unique Iranian travelogue is written from Qashqai people point of view and offers a new reading of historical events in a cultural context. What is more, the book sheds light on some aspects of Qajarid history by describing the events that took place during the last years of Ahmad Shah Qajar reign and just few month after the third Esfand's coup d’état in Feb. 22, 1921. Haj Ayaz Khan’s narration of his pilgrimage to Mecca (hajj) paints a clear picture of cities, holly places, and lifestyles. His attention to detail from the price of goods and commodities to every day matters brings the book to life. But it is his ability to go beyond simple description, to compare Iran and neighboring countries (Specially Iraq, Saudi Arabia, Yemen) on social and economic matters that turns the book to an extraordinary travelogue.
