= Tang-e-Sayad and Sabzkuh Biosphere Reserve =

Biosphere reserve in Iran

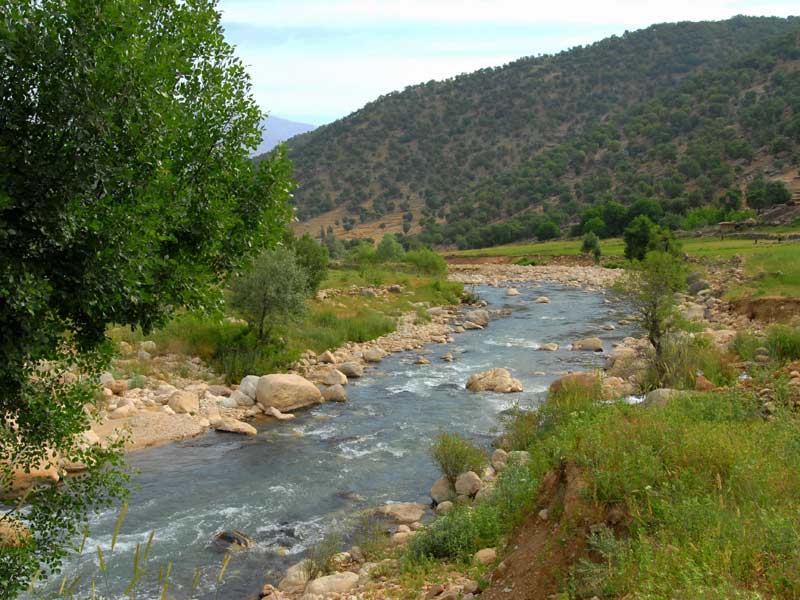
- Tang-e-Sayad Protected Area

- Location within Iran
- Interactive map of Tang-e-Sayad and Sabzkuh Biosphere Reserve
- Location: Chaharmahal and Bakhtiari Province
- Coordinates: 31.54°N 50.20°E
- Area: 5,328.78 km^{2} (2,057.45 sq mi)
- Designation: Man and the Biosphere Programme
- Designated: 2015
- Governing body: Iranian Department of Environment

The Tang-e-Sayad and Sabzkuh Biosphere Reserve is one of the UNESCO Biosphere reserves in Iran, located in Chaharmahal and Bakhtiari Province. It includes the Tang-e-Sayad Protected Area, Sabzkuh Protected Area, Helen Protected Area, Choghakhor Wetland, Gandoman Wetland, Soolghan Wetland, and Ali Abad Wetland. This area is within the boundaries of Shahrekord County, Borujen County, Lordegan County, and Kiar County.

== Features ==
The general natural scenery of this area is mountainous and located in the Iranian-Turanian (Zagros) region, encompassing a collection of forest and non-forest mountain ecosystems, grasslands, wetlands, and urban areas.

In this region, 124 animal species have been identified so far, including: mammals, birds, reptiles, and amphibians. Of these, three mammal species are classified as EN (Endangered) and VU (Vulnerable) on the International Union for Conservation of Nature (IUCN) list, and three species are listed in Appendices I and II of CITES, and four species are nationally protected.

Among the 70 identified bird species, two species are listed in Appendix II of CITES, 12 species are nationally protected, and one reptile species is classified as VU by the International Union for Conservation of Nature and is nationally protected. In addition, 252 plant species have been identified in this area so far, of which 30 species are endemic to Iran, two species are endangered and 70 species have genetic value.

The presence of 52 springs, high peaks, rocky walls, snow-covered heights, shrub and herbaceous vegetation on the slopes of mountains and valleys, along with herds of wild goats and sheep, are among the beautiful natural features of Tang-e-Sayad.

Another important feature of this biosphere reserve is the significant population of nomads and the existence of ancient livelihood and cultural traditions, as well as numerous natural, ecotouristic, and research attractions, which are of great importance.

== Global registration ==
The major reasons for selecting and accepting this area as a biosphere reserve are its location in one of the important biological and geographical divisions of the world, the presence of genetic resources and diverse and valuable plant and animal species, the existence of unique mountain, plain, forest, and wetland ecosystems that need protection, the suitable opportunities for achieving sustainable development in this area, the presence of various residents and indigenous people such as nomads, villagers, and urbanites, and the richness of the plant and animal biodiversity in this area, which is estimated to be 180 times the national average of Iran.

On June 9, 2015, at the 27th meeting of the global program Man and the Biosphere (MAB) of UNESCO in France, this area was added to the list of world biosphere reserves. The area of this region is 532,878 hectares, which includes 3 zones: a core area of 21,234 hectares (52,470 acres), a buffer zone of 24,186 hectares (59,760 acres), and a transition area of 269,782 hectares (666,650 acres). This reserve is the eleventh biosphere reserve in Iran and the second reserve to be globally registered since the 1979 revolution in Iran. It is also the first reserve to have a comprehensive management program.
