= Omidabad =

Omidabad or Ommidabad (Persian: اميدآباد) may refer to:

- Omidabad, Chaharmahal and Bakhtiari
- Omidabad, Golestan
