= Cholicheh =

City in Chaharmahal and Bakhtiari province, Iran

Cholicheh Persian: چليچه
- City
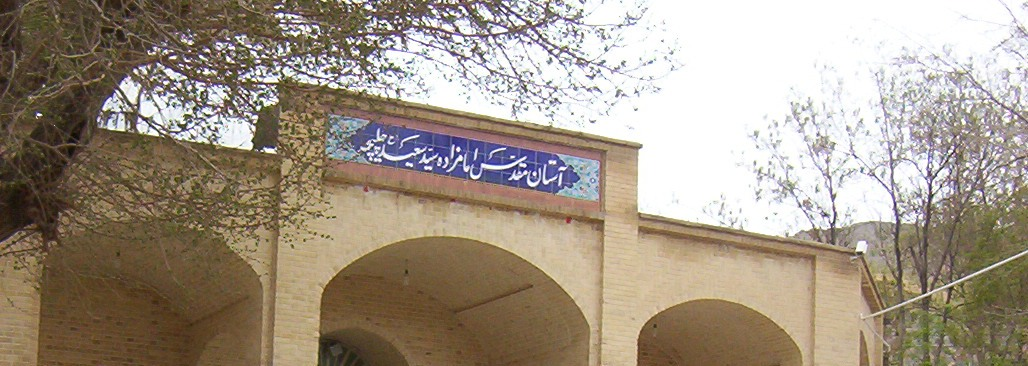

- Location within Iran
- Coordinates: 32°13′48″N 50°37′45″E
- Country: Iran
- Province: Chaharmahal and Bakhtiari
- County: Farsan
- District: Junqan
- Established as a city: 2013

Population (2016)
  - Total: 4,945
- Time zone: UTC+3:30 (IRST)

Cholicheh (Persian: چليچه) (Note: Also romanized as Chelīcheh and Cholīcheh; also known as Chelaw Chāh, Chelecheh, and Chelow Chāh) is a city in Junqan District of Farsan County, Chaharmahal and Bakhtiari province, Iran, serving as the administrative center for Mizdej-e Sofla Rural District. It is in the Iran Standard Time Zone (GMT+3:30). Note that Iran uses a special half-hour time zone.

== Demographics ==
=== Ethnicity ===
The city is populated by Lurs.

=== Population ===
At the time of the 2006 National Census, Cholicheh's population was 4,656 in 1,109 households, when it was a village in Mizdej-e Sofla Rural District of the Central District. The following census in 2011 counted 4,993 people in 1,352 households, by which time the rural district had been separated from the district in the formation of Junqan District. The 2016 census measured the population as 4,945 people in 1,413 households, when the village had been converted to a city.
