= Yadollah Jahanbazi =

Iranian football referee (born 1973)

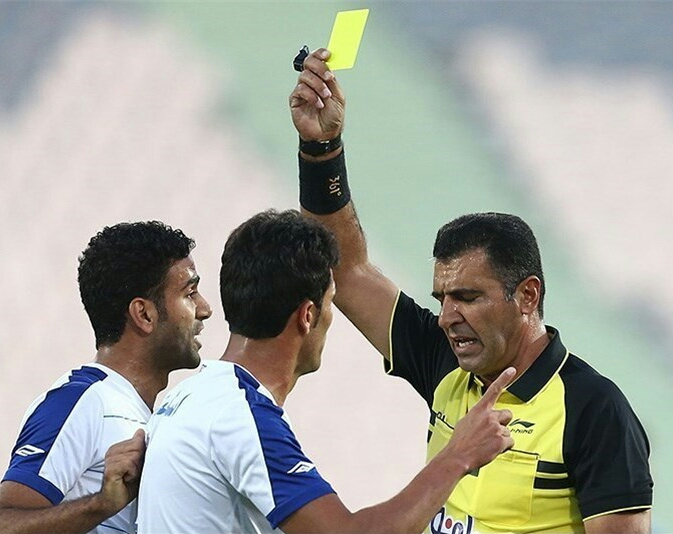
- Full name: Yadollah Jahanbazi
- Born: March 24, 1973 (age 53); Junqan, Iran

Domestic
| Years | League | Role |
| 1999–2017 | Iran Pro League | Referee |

International
| Years | League | Role |
| 2003–2017 | FIFA listed | Referee |

Yadollah Jahanbazi (born 24 March 1973 in Junqan) is an Iranian football referee who has been a full international referee for FIFA.

Jahanbazi has officiated international matches during the period from 2009 to 2011, but he was no longer included on the FIFA list as of 2013. He has served as a referee at competitions including the 2014 FIFA World Cup qualifiers, beginning with the opening-round match between Cambodia and Laos.
