= Gujan =

City in Chaharmahal and Bakhtiari province, Iran

Gujan Persian: گوجان
- City
- Location within Iran
- Coordinates: 32°14′40″N 50°32′35″E
- Country: Iran
- Province: Chaharmahal and Bakhtiari
- County: Farsan
- District: Central
- Established as a city: 2013

Population (2016)
  - Total: 6,179
- Time zone: UTC+3:30 (IRST)

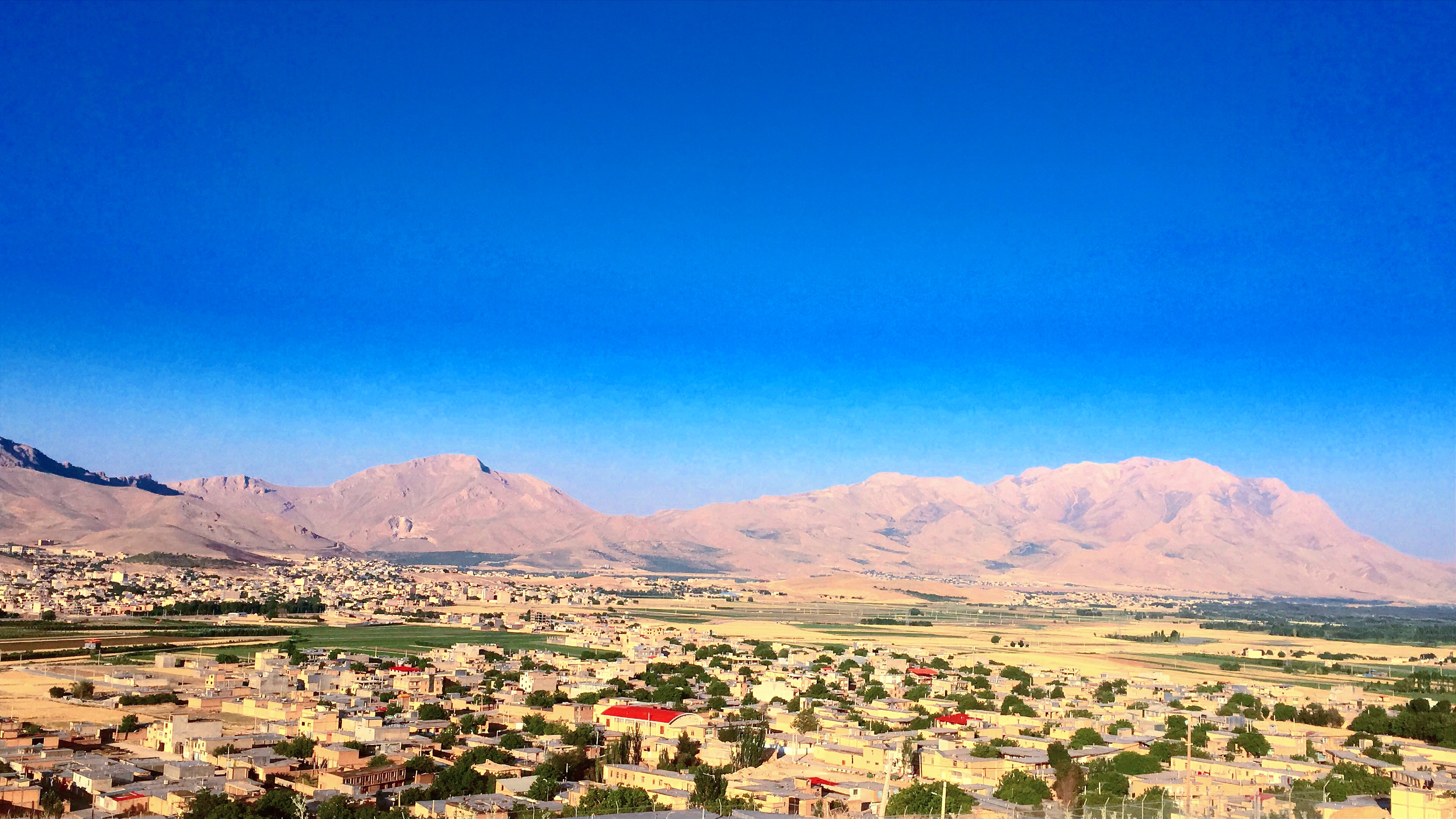
View of Gujan

Gujan (Persian: گوجان) (Note: Also romanized as Goujan and Goūjān; also known as Goūgūn, Goujūn, and Kūjān) is a city in the Central District of Farsan County, Chaharmahal and Bakhtiari province, Iran, serving as the administrative center for Mizdej-e Olya Rural District. The rural district was previously administered from the city of Babaheydar.

== Demographics ==
=== Ethnicity ===
The city is populated by Lurs.

=== Population ===
At the time of the 2006 National Census, Gujan's population was 5,468 in 1,289 households, when it was a village in Mizdej-e Olya Rural District. The following census in 2011 counted 5,881 people in 1,563 households. The 2016 census measured the population as 6,179 people in 1,780 households, by which time Gujan had been converted to a city.
