= Chaharmahali Turkic =

Oghuz Turkic language spoken in Iran

- چهارمحال تۆرکیسی / Çəharməhal türkîsi
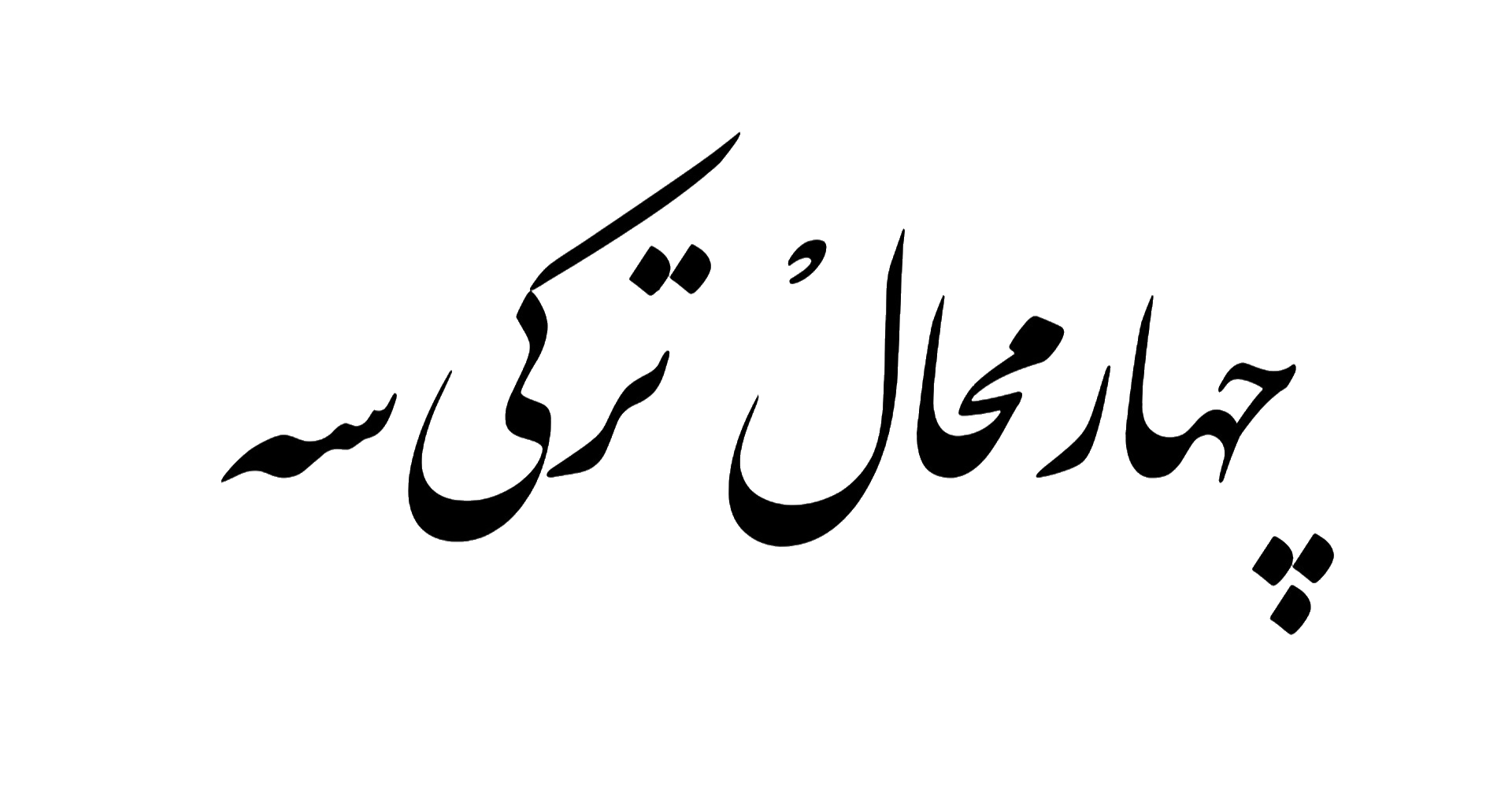
- Native to: Iran
- Ethnicity: Chaharmahali Turks
- Native speakers: (undated figure of 30,000)
- Language family: Turkic: Common Turkic; Oghuz; Southern Oghuz; Chaharmahali Turkic

Language codes
- ISO 639-3: –
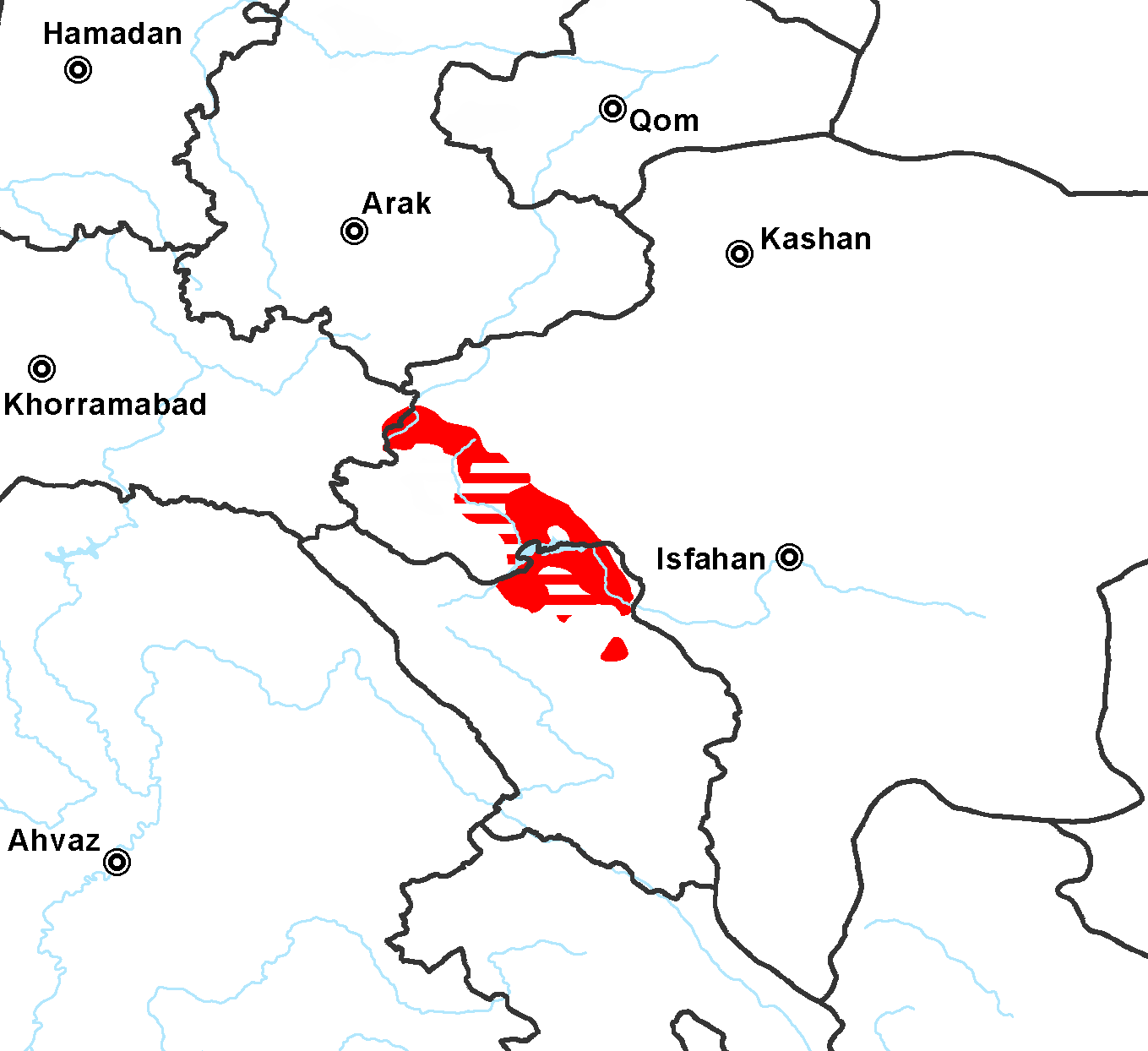
- Distribution of Chaharmahali Turkic spoken as a native language

Chaharmahali Turkic (چهارمحال تۆرکیسی Çəharməhal Türkîsi/چهارمحالی تۆرکی Çəharməhali Türkî) is a proposed Oghuz Turkic variety spoken in Iran's Chaharmahal and Bakhtiari province and in western Isfahan province, where it is described as "Esfahan Province Turkic" by linguists. It is an understudied and generally unclassified variety of Oghuz Turkic distinct from Azerbaijani and Qashqai, being closer to the latter. Chaharmahali Turkic is not to be confused with "Charmahali Persian," (fa) a Persian dialect spoken in the same region.

== Language Distribution ==
The Atlas of the Languages of Iran (ALI) published a point-based and polygon language distribution map of Chaharmahal and Bakhtiari province and several linguistic data maps.

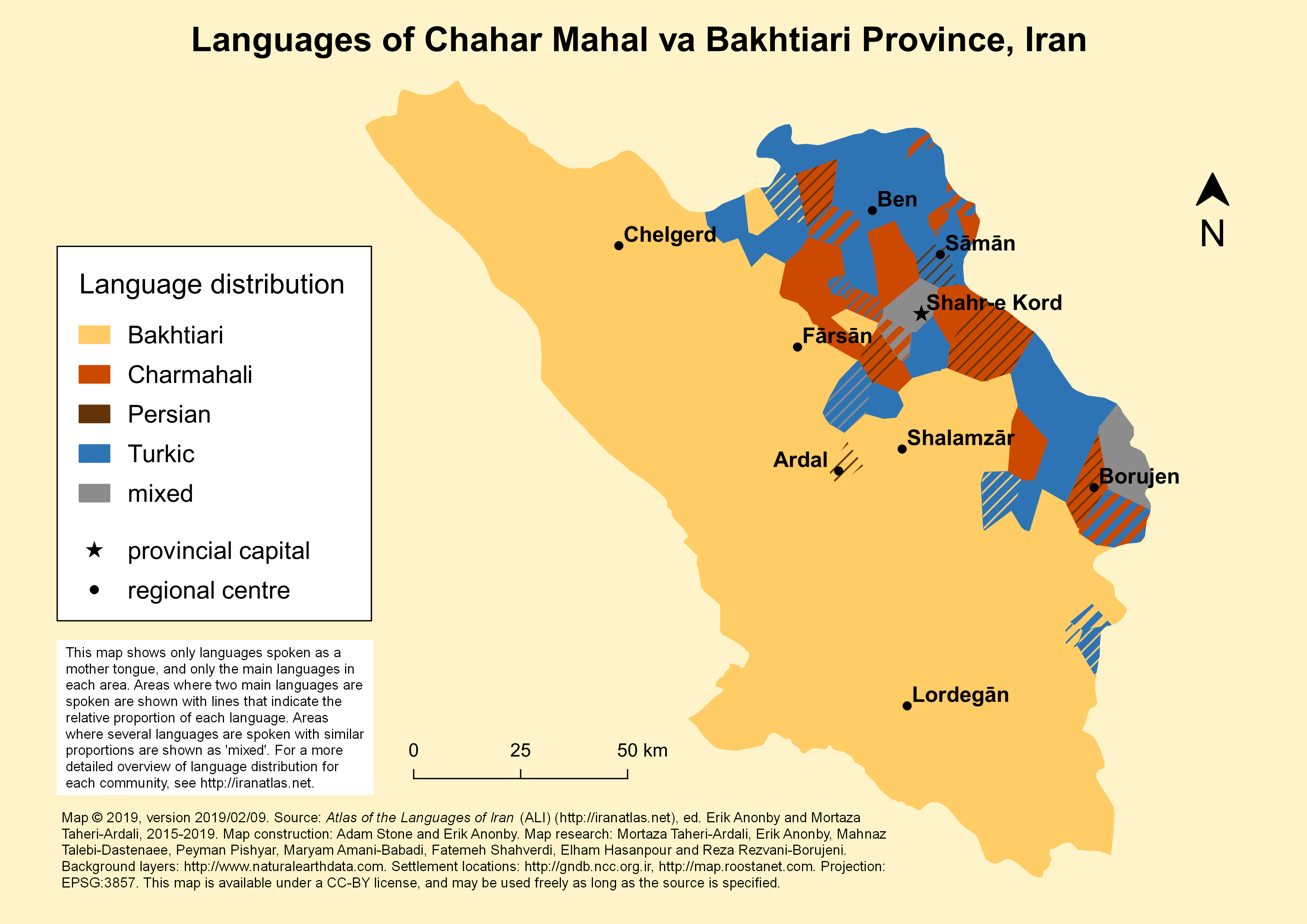
Linguistic map of Chahar Mahal va Bakhtiari Province, showing Turkic of Chaharmahal (including Qashqai)

== See also ==
- Qizilbash
- Azerbaijani language
- Qashqai language
