= Babaheydar =

City in Chaharmahal and Bakhtiari province, Iran

Babaheydar Persian: باباحيدر
- City
- Location within Iran
- Coordinates: 32°19′42″N 50°28′16″E
- Country: Iran
- Province: Chaharmahal and Bakhtiari
- County: Farsan
- District: Babaheydar
- Established as a city: 1992

Population (2016)
  - Total: 11,202
- Time zone: UTC+3:30 (IRST)

Babaheydar (Persian: باباحيدر) (Note: Also romanized as Bāba Haīdar and Bābā Ḩeydar) is a city in, and the capital of, Babaheydar District in Farsan County, Chaharmahal and Bakhtiari province, Iran. The village of Babaheydar was converted to a city in 1992. It served as the administrative center for Mizdej-e Olya Rural District until transferred to the city of Gujan.

== Demographics ==
=== Ethnicity ===
The city is populated by Lurs.

=== Population ===
At the time of the 2006 National Census, the city's population was 10,922 in 2,245 households, when it was in the Central District. The following census in 2011 counted 11,099 people in 2,897 households. The 2016 census measured the population of the city as 11,202 people in 3,276 households, by which time it had been transferred to Babaheydar District.
