= Choghakhor Wetland =

Wetland in Iran

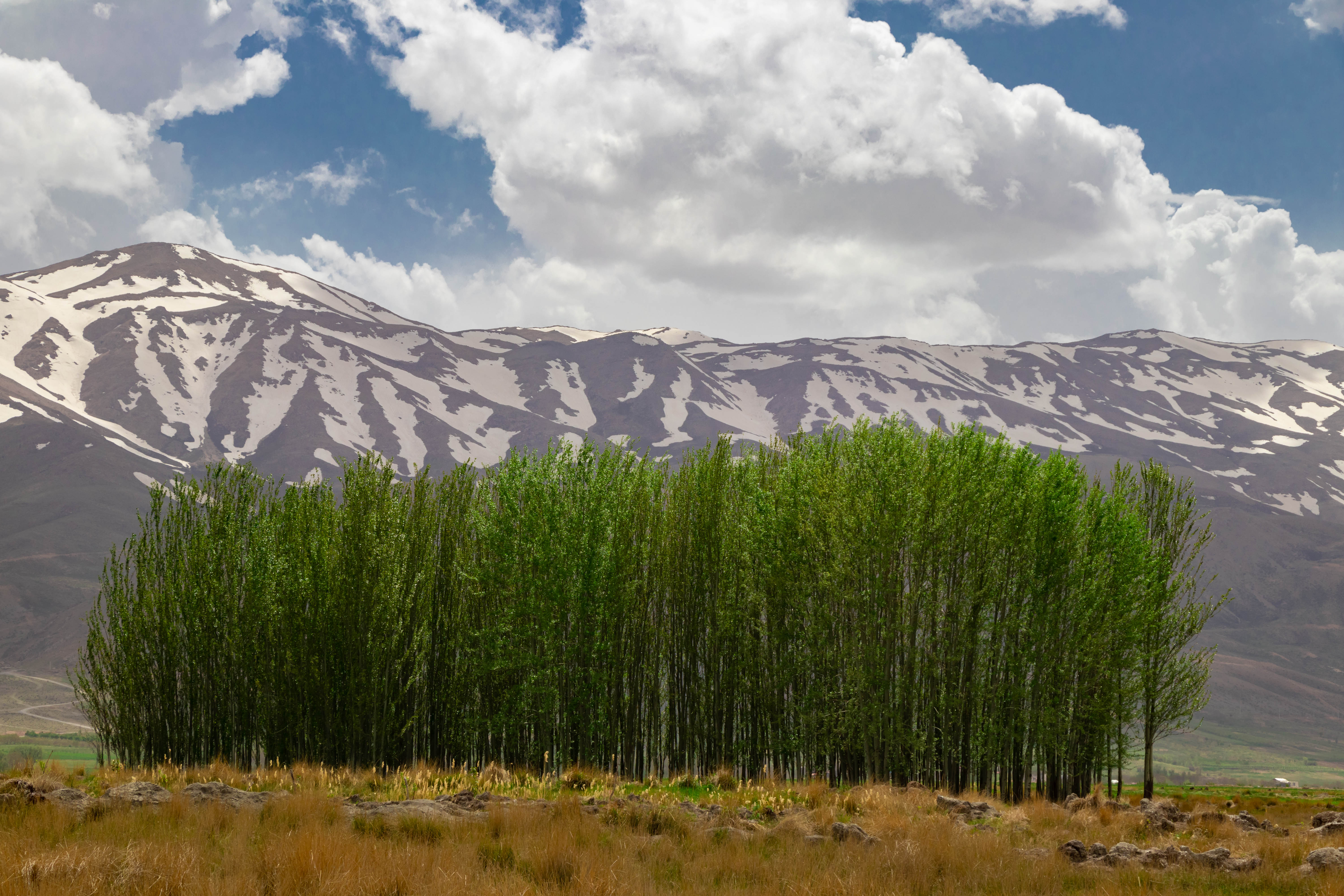

- Location within Iran
- Interactive map of Choghakhor Wetland
- Location: Chaharmahal and Bakhtiari Province, Iran
- Coordinates: 31.924°N 50.905°E
- Area: 1,687 ha (6.51 sq mi)
- Administrator: Department of Environment of Iran

Ramsar Wetland
- Official name: Choghakhor Wetland
- Designated: 3 March 2010
- Reference no.: 1939

Choghakhor Wetland is a wetland in Chaharmahal and Bakhtiari Province, Iran, considered to be one of the most important sites in Iran for the endemic Zagros pupfish, Aphanius vladykovi. Choghakhor Wetland, recognized as one of Iran’s 105 important wetlands for birds - especially endangered ones - is part of the Tang-e-Sayad and Sabzkuh Biosphere Reserve. The wetland ranks sixth in the country’s classification of important wetlands for bird watching.

== Location ==
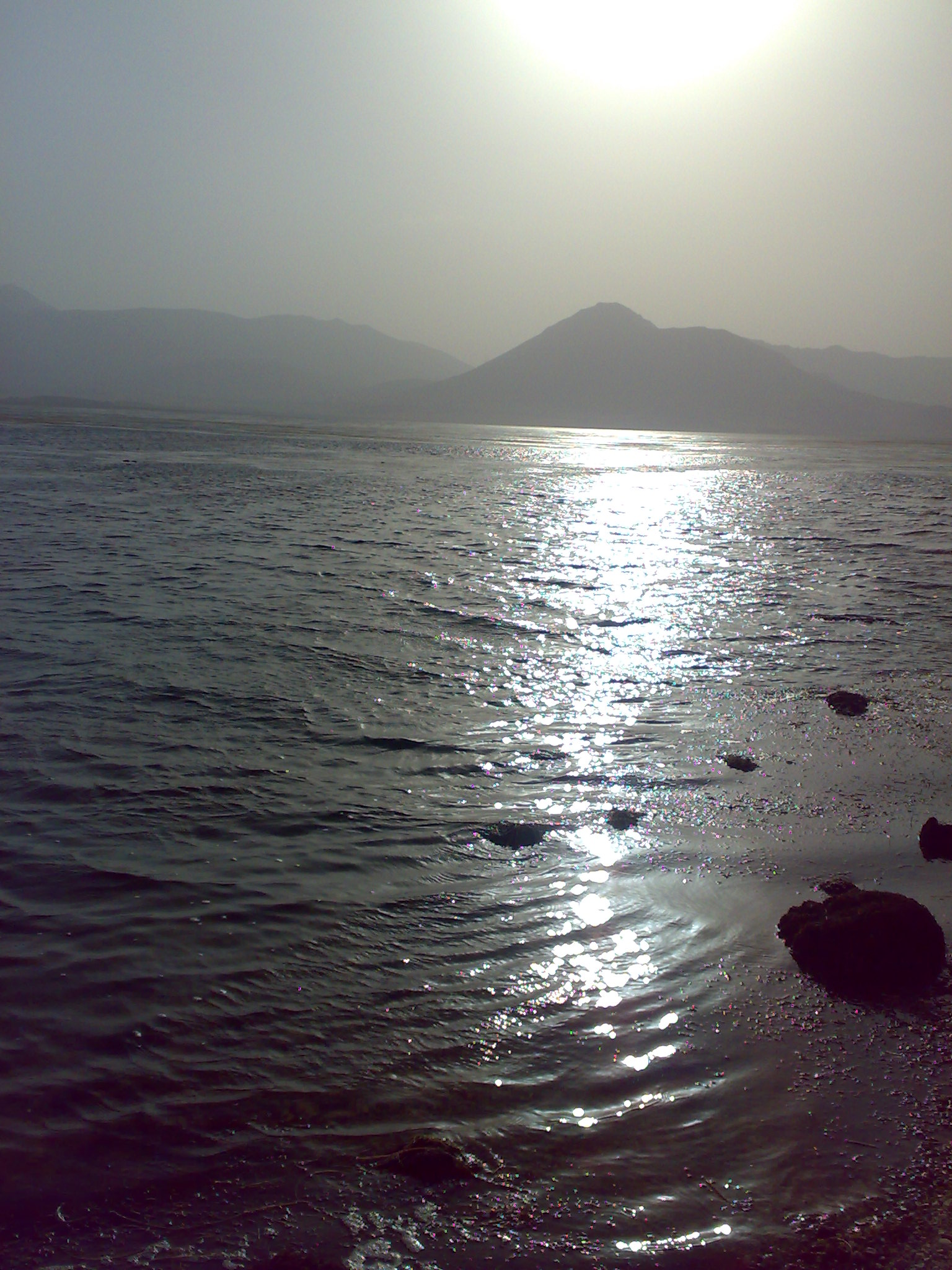

Chaghakhor Wetland is located in Chaharmahal and Bakhtiari Province In the Borojen region in the heights of the Zagros Mountains on the Iranian Plateau. The area of this wetland is 1687 hectares, which is considered a no-hunting area.

== Biodiversity ==
It is important for flood control, ground water replenishment, and is generally considered a reservoir for biodiversity.

=== Flora ===
In this place there are plants such as Achillea millefolium which have important medicinal properties. Also the presence of wild Papaver which adds to the beauty of the region

=== Fauna ===
This wetland is home to thousands of birds, and other migratory birds also visit in spring and winter. Birds are the most prominent inhabitants of this wetland, arriving mainly from late autumn to late winter, making it a beautiful and idyllic place.

Choghakhor Wetland is home to 47 bird species, including migratory birds such as the northern pintail (Anas acuta). The wetland is home to more than 1% of the population of the common pintail (Anas strepera) and endangered species such as the white-headed duck (Oxyura leucocephala) and the eastern golden eagle (Aquila heliaca). Choghakhor Wetland is also one of the most important habitats for the native Zagros fish (Aphanius vladykovi) in Iran.

== Bibliography ==
- Baqeri, O. 2000. Chaghakhor Wetland and its general characteristics. Moj-e Sabz, Tehran, 1:36-38. In Persian
