= Farsan =

City in Chaharmahal and Bakhtiari province, Iran

Farsan Persian: فارسان
- City
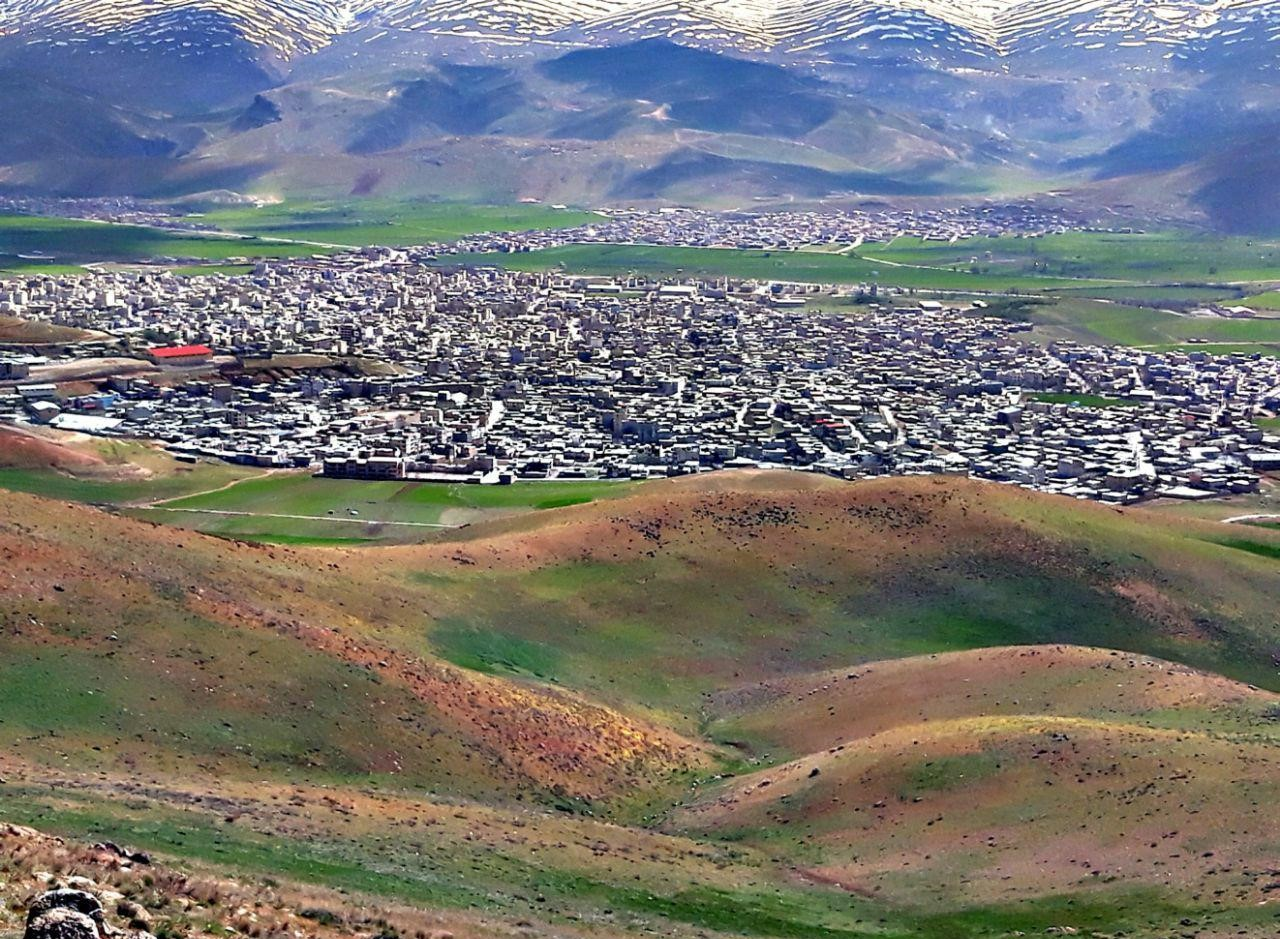

- Location within Iran
- Coordinates: 32°15′18″N 50°33′47″E
- Country: Iran
- Province: Chaharmahal and Bakhtiari
- County: Farsan
- District: Central

Population (2016)
  - Total: 30,504
- Time zone: UTC+3:30 (IRST)

Farsan (Persian: فارسان) (Note: Also romanized as Fārsān; also known as Fārsā, Fārsīān, and Farsūn) is a city in the Central District of Farsan County, Chaharmahal and Bakhtiari province, Iran, serving as capital of both the county and the district.

== History ==
During the 2025–2026 Iranian protests and 2026 Iran massacres, Saghar Etemadi, a hairdresser and nail-technician from Farsan, was shot in the face by Islamic Republic security forces.

== Demographics ==
=== Ethnicity ===
The city is populated by Lurs.

=== Population ===
At the time of the 2006 National Census, the city's population was 26,219 in 5,665 households. The following census in 2011 counted 28,013 people in 7,190 households. The 2016 census measured the population of the city as 30,504 people in 8,400 households.

== Climate ==
Farsan has a hot dry-summer Continental climate (Dsa), with hot summer days, cool summer nights and cold winter days, freezing winter nights. Rainfall is significant in winter and spring but not so much in summer, only often resulting from thunderstorms.

Frost is quite common in the region. Farsan on average experiences 112.5 days with frost from November to March, with rare occurrences in April or October.

Climate data for Farsan (2005-2013 normals)
Month	Jan	Feb	Mar	Apr	May	Jun	Jul	Aug	Sep	Oct	Nov	Dec	Year
Mean daily maximum °C (°F)	5 (41)	8 (46)	14 (57)	18 (64)	24 (75)	31 (88)	34 (93)	33 (91)	29 (84)	23 (73)	14 (57)	9 (48)	20 (68)
Daily mean °C (°F)	−1 (30)	2 (36)	7 (45)	11 (52)	16 (61)	21 (70)	25 (77)	23 (73)	19 (66)	14 (57)	7 (45)	2 (36)	12 (54)
Mean daily minimum °C (°F)	−8 (18)	−4 (25)	0 (32)	4 (39)	8 (46)	11 (52)	15 (59)	14 (57)	9 (48)	5 (41)	0 (32)	−5 (23)	4 (39)
Average precipitation mm (inches)	81 (3.2)	85 (3.3)	69 (2.7)	72 (2.8)	12 (0.5)	1 (0.0)	0 (0)	0 (0)	2 (0.1)	9 (0.4)	89 (3.5)	74 (2.9)	494 (19.4)
Average relative humidity (%)	58	60	47	49	42	30	27	27	30	38	56	58	44
Mean monthly sunshine hours	198	198	242	234	279	336	329	325	309	272	205	203	3,130
Source: Chaharmahalmet
