= Qashqai kelim =

Qashqai kelim is one of the most well-known types of kelim (sometimes gelime or gelim) and one of the most prominent handwoven items of the Qashqai tribe. These gelims, which are mainly woven by the women of the tribe, reflect the culture, beliefs, and nomadic lifestyle of this people and are world-renowned for their originality in design, color, and weaving technique. The most important producer of Qashqai gelims is the Dareshuri tribe.

The Qashqai kelim received the seal of authenticity from UNESCO in November 2013.

== Features ==
The Qashqai kelim is distinguished from other gelims due to its energy and dynamism in design and color. The main characteristics of this handwoven kelim can be examined in three areas: design, color, and texture.

=== Design and motif ===
Qashqai kelim designs are mostly subjective, meaning that the weaver does not use a pre-prepared plan and implements the designs on the loom based on her creativity, memories and inspirations. This feature makes each kelim a unique work. The designs used are rooted in ancient beliefs and the nature surrounding the tribe's life. These designs are divided into several main categories:

- Geometric motifs: such as the chevron, the square, and repeating rhombuses.
- Symbolic animal motifs: including simplified and stylized depictions of animals such as goats, deer, horses, and birds, each of which symbolizes nature, blessing, or freedom.
- Symbolic plant motifs: such as the tree of life design, which symbolizes immortality and growth.
- Object-based motifs: designs such as combs, scissors, and mirrors that reflect the weaver's everyday tools.

The main background motifs are lachak toranj (medallion-and-corner) and moharramat (striped) designs.

=== Raw materials and dyeing ===
The main material in the weaving of the Qashqai kelim is hand-spun wool. Using wool from local sheep increases the durability and quality of the kelim. Sometimes a combination of wool and goat hair is also used for the weaving.

One of the most prominent features of these gelims is the use of natural and passionate colors. The main colors such as red from the root of the rubia tinctorum, blue from the leaves of the indigo plant, and brown from the skin of walnut shells or pomegranate skin are obtained.

=== Structure and weaving method ===
Qashqai gelims are often woven using the slit weave technique. In this method, to change colors in a row, the weft is looped around the warp at the color border and then back. This creates a small vertical slit or gap at the border of the patterns, which helps to separate the colors and gives the kelim a light and delicate appearance. This lightweight yet sturdy construction makes the kelim ideal for nomadic life, which requires easy transportation.

== See also ==
- Handicrafts
