= Qashqai people =

Turkic ethnic group in Iran

Qashqai
قشقایی
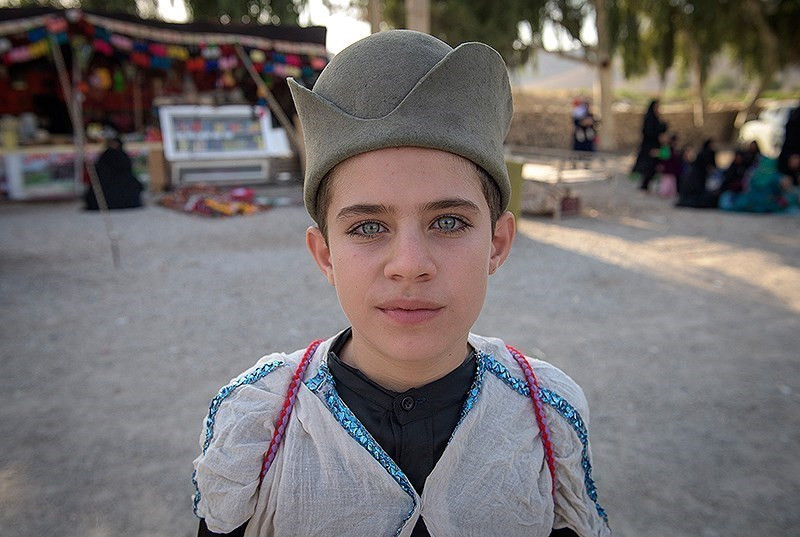
- Qashqai boy wearing a traditional hat in rural Fars province

Total population
- c. 300,000–2,000,000

Regions with significant populations
- Southern Iran, Central Iran

Languages
- Qashqai, Persian

Religion
- Shia Islam

Related ethnic groups
- Lurs, Kurds, Arabs, Other Turkic peoples Especially Chaharmahali Turks

Qashqai people (Note: also spelled Qashqa'i, Qashqay, Kashkai, Kashkay, Qashqayı, Gashgai, Gashgay, Ghashghai, Ghashghaei) (/ˌkæʃˈkaɪ/ kash-KY; Persian: قشقایی [ˌɢæʃɢɒːˈjiː]) are a Turkic tribal people indigenous to southern Iran. Almost all of them speak Qashqai, an Oghuz language they call Turki, as well as Persian in formal use. The Qashqai mainly live in the provinces of Fars, Khuzestan, Kohgiluyeh and Boyer-Ahmad, Chaharmahal and Bakhtiari, Bushehr and southern Isfahan.

The majority of Qashqai people were originally nomadic pastoralists and some remain so today. The traditional nomadic Qashqai traveled with their flocks twice yearly between the summer highland pastures north of Shiraz roughly 480 km or 300 miles south and the winter pastures on lower (and warmer) lands near the Persian Gulf, to the southwest of Shiraz. The majority, however, have now become partially or wholly sedentary. The trend towards settlement has been increasing markedly since the 1960s under government pressure, and encouragement, which has built housing for those willing to settle, starting in the early 20th century during the Pahlavi era. However, for those who continue their migratory lifestyle, the Iranian government maintains and controls travel corridors for the Qashqai and their livestock, and other populations practicing pastoral migrations.

The Qashqai are made up of five major tribes: the Amale (Qashqai) / Amaleh (Persian), the Dere-Shorlu / Darreh-Shuri, the Kashkollu / Kashkuli, the Shishbeyli / Sheshboluki and the Eymur / Farsimadan. Smaller tribes include the Qaracha / Qarache'i, Rahimli / Rahimi and Safi-Khanli / Safi-Khani.

== History ==
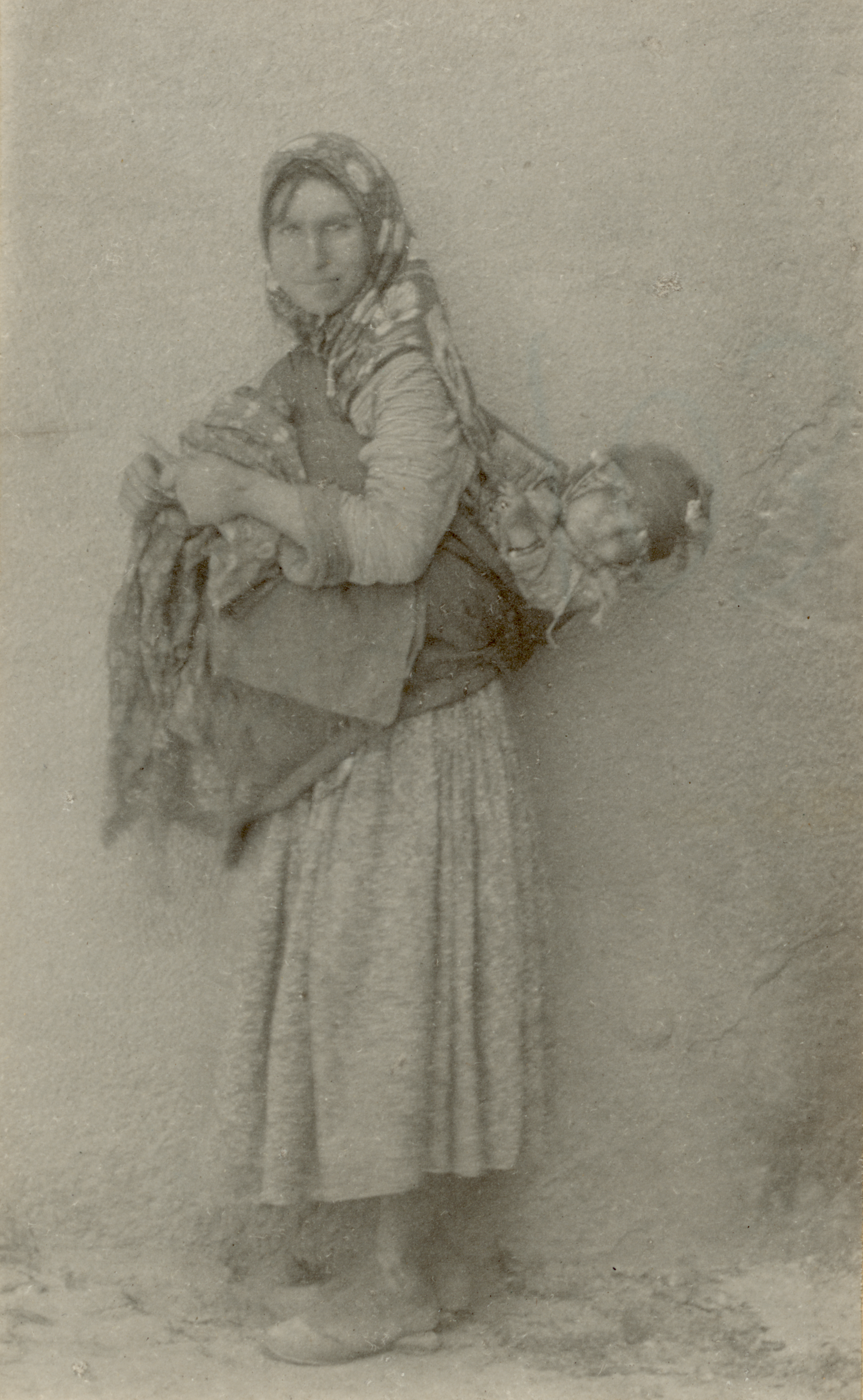
Qashqai woman and child, 1891

Historically, the Turkic people are believed to have arrived in Iran from Central Asia from the 11th or 12th century onwards.

Told to Marie-Tèrése Ullens by the Ilbeg Malek Mansur, brother of the Ilkhan, Nasser Khan, Chief of the Qashqa'i, in 1953:

To survive, nomads have always been obliged to fight. They lead a wandering life and do not accumulate documents and archives. But in the evenings, around fires that are burning low, the elders will relate striking events, deeds of valour in which the tribes pride themselves. Thus the epic tale is told from father to son, down through the ages. The tribes of Central Asia were forced by wars, strife, upheavals, to abandon their steppes and seek new pasture grounds...so the Huns, the Visigoths, and before them the Aryans, had invaded India, Iran, Europe. The Turks, forsaking the regions where they had dwelt for centuries, started moving down through the Altai Mountains and Caspian depressions, establishing themselves eventually on the frontiers of the Iranian Empire and in Asia Minor. Though these versions differ, we believe that the arrival of our Tribes in Iran coincided with the conquests of Genghis Khan, in the thirteenth century. Soon after, our ancestors established themselves on the slopes of the Caucasus. We are descendants of the "Tribe of the Ak Koyunlu" the "Tribe of the White Sheep" famed for being the only tribe in history capable of inflicting a defeat on Tamerlane. For centuries we dwelt on the lands surrounding Ardebil, but, in the first half of the sixteenth century we settled in southern Persia, Shah Ismail having asked our warriors to defend this part of the country against the intrusions of the Portuguese. Thus, our Tribes came to the Province of Fars, near the Persian Gulf, and are still only separated from it by a ridge of mountains, the Makran.

The yearly migrations of the Kashkai, seeking fresh pastures, drive them from the south to the north, where they move to their summer quarters "Yailaq" in the high mountains; and from the north to the south, to their winter quarters, "Qishlaq". In summer, the Kashkai flocks graze on the slopes of the Kuh-è-Dinar; a group of mountains from 12,000 to 15,000 feet, that are part of the Zagros chain. In autumn the Kashkai break camp, and by stages leave the highlands. They winter in the warmer regions near Firuzabad, Kazerun, Jerrè, Farashband, on the banks of the river Mound, till, in April, they start once more on their yearly trek. The migration is organised and controlled by the Kashkai Chief. The Tribes carefully avoid villages and towns such as Shiraz and Isfahan, lest their flocks, estimated at seven million head, might cause serious damage. The annual migration is the largest of any Persian tribe.

It is difficult to give exact statistics, but we believe that the Tribes now number 400,000 men, women and children.

The Qashqai were a significant political force in Qajar Iran during the late 19th and early 20th centuries. During World War I, they were influenced by the German consular official Wilhelm Wassmuss and sided with the German Empire. During World War II, the Qashgais attempted to organize resistance against the Anglo-Soviet invasion of Iran, receiving some ineffectual assistance from Nazi Germany in 1943 by the means of Operation Anton, which (along with Operation François) proved a complete failure.

In 1945–1946 there was a major rebellion of a number of tribal confederacies, including the Qashgais, who fought valiantly until the invading Russians were repelled. The Qashgais revolted during 1962–1964 due to the land reforms of the White Revolution. Gamal Abdel Nasser saw potential in the Qashqai tribe to undermine the Pahlavi government. In 1963, when the Qashqai protested against the Iranian government, the Iranian government used armed force, causing Qashqai leaders to seek support from Nasser.

On 2 February 1963, the Qashqai leaders met with Al-Deeb in Switzerland, after which the Qashqai were issued Egyptian passports in 1963 and given training in Egypt in 1964. The revolt was put down and within a few years many Qashqais had settled. Most of the tribal leaders were sent to exile. After the Iranian Revolution of 1979, the living leader, Khosrow Khan Qashqai, returned to Iran from exile in the United States and Germany. However, another Qashqai revolt erupted in 1979, against the Islamic republic, after the arrest of Qashqai tribal leaders.

When anti-government protests began in 1978, Qashqai participated, although not in large numbers. However, towards the end of the year, Naser Khan and Khosrow Khan, the sons of Qashqai tribal chief Sawlat od-Dowleh, who were in exile in Europe, were contacted by the Qashqai leadership in Iran, seeking advice. They cautiously visited Ayatollah Khomeini in Paris, who reminded them that their father embraced calls from the ulema for a jihad against the British in World War I, expressing hope that they would similarly embrace the call from the clergy if called upon.

Although Mohammad Reza Shah had personally attacked the exiled Qashqai leaders in one of the last speeches he delivered before fleeing Iran, Naser Khan returned to Iran before the Shah left. Naser Khan displaying a hesitance and reticence in his actions allowed him to be co-opted by the revolutionaries to act as a mediator between rival tribes, just as his father Sowlat-od-Dowleh had acted for Reza Shah.

Many Qashqai rearmed and sometimes forcibly captured land, particularly from non-tribal farmers, herders, and orchard owners. The optimism the Qashqai initially had about their place in a new Iran largely died in the summer of 1979, and the Qashqai leaders, who attempted to unite the tribal opposition in southern Iran, were shocked by the force used against the 1979 Kurdish revolt. Khomeini had only acknowledged the suffering of tribes under the Pahlavi government but never made solid assurances.

When parliamentary elections took place in 1980, Khosrow Khan, who received 70% of the vote in the Eqlid district, west of Shiraz, was rejected by the Majlis who accused him of SAVAK and CIA ties and a family history of landlordism. He was arrested by the IRGC in Tehran, before being released, arrested again, and then escaping and returning to Fars. There, he gathered Qashqai, Boyerahmadi Luri, and Basseri tribesmen, and he and Naser Khan resisted the Iranian forces for two years from June 1980 to July 1982. They were considered the only group in Iran effectively offering credible resistance. After a sham amnesty, Khosrow Khan was captured in Shiraz, sent to Tehran, and sentenced to death by an Islamic Revolutionary Court and hanged on 8 October 1982, in Shiraz.

== Major tribes ==
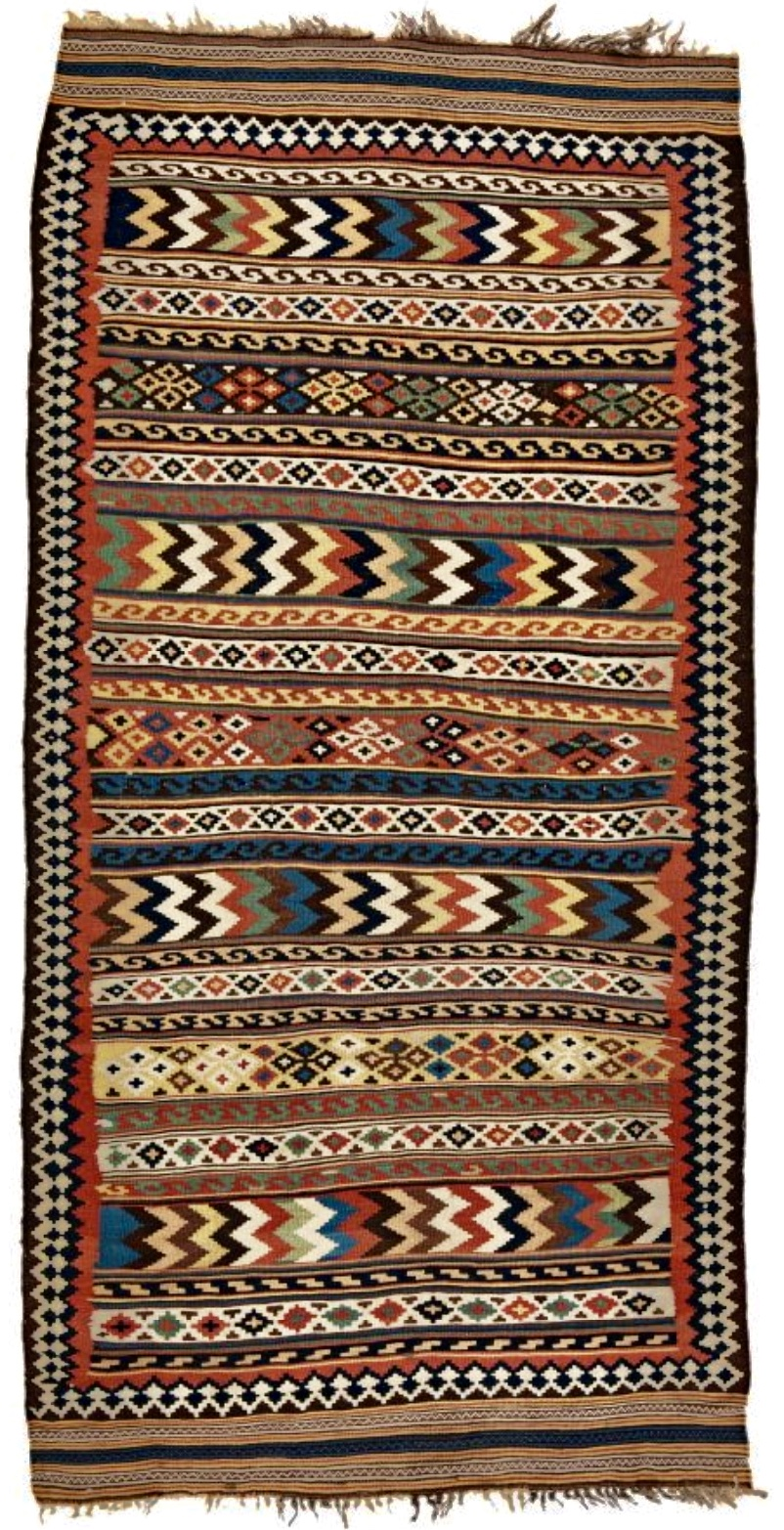
19th century Qashqai Confederation Kilim. The multicoloured zigzag fields in an 'M' shape are unusual. These kilims have been used as tent dividers or to cover up storage sacks within a home, so a horizontal viewpoint might have been intended by the weaver.

The Qashqai emerged as a conglomeration of clans of different ethnic origins, mostly Turkic, but also Lur, Kurdish, and Arab, and they spoke the Qashqai language. The Turkic component of the Qashqai mainly descended from Khalaj, Afshar, Bayat, Qajar, Qaragozlu, Shamlu, and Igdir tribes which joined the confederacy, while the Lur and Kurdish components descended from the tribes which had followed Karim Khan Zand to Fars and were later absorbed by the confederacy. Other groups of Persian, Baloch, and gypsy origin had also historically joined the confederacy. By the 21st century, the Qashqai consisted of six main tribes, known as the Darreshuri, Kashkuli Bozorg, Kashkuli Kuchak, Farsimadan, Amaleh, and Shashboluki, and they collectively included around 200 smaller tribes.

=== Amale / Amaleh ===
People of the Amaleh tribe were originally warriors and workmen attached to the household of the Ilkhani, or paramount chief; recruited from all the Qashqai tribes they constituted the Ilkhani's bodyguard and retinue. The Qashqai chiefs historically came from the Amaleh tribe. By 1956, the Amaleh tribe comprised as many as 6,000 families.

=== Dere-Shorlu / Dareshuri / Darehshouri ===
The Dareshuri are said to have joined the Qashqai tribal confederation during the reign of Karim Khan Zand (1163–93/1750–79). According to Persian government statistics, there were about 5,169 Dareshuri families, or 27,396 individuals, in 1360 sh./1981. The Dareshuri were "the greatest horse-breeders and owners among the Qashqai". The policy of forced sedentarization of the nomadic tribes pursued by Reza Shah Pahlavi (1304–20 SH./1925–41) resulted in the loss of 80–90 percent of the Dareshuri horses, but the tribe made a recovery after World War II. Reza Shah Pahlavi also executed Hossein khan Darehshouri the head of Darehshouri family in order to take back the control of the Fars province which was controlled by Darehshouri tribe during the Qajar era.

According to Ziad Khan, the Darreshuri consisted of the Narre'i, Qarrekhlu, Jeyranlu, Ayeblu, Kheyratlu, Naderlu, Ahangar, Telabazlu, Bolvardi, Orojlu, Janbazlu, Hemmat-Ali Kikha'i, Shavazlu, Imanlu, Khodaverdilu, Abdol-Soleymanlu, Sadeghlu, Qara Qovanlu (or Qara Qoyunlu), Shahin Kikha'i, Naser Kikha'i, Dundulu, Qara Gechlu, Karimlu, Darzi, Amaleh-ye Hosayn Khan, Amaleh-ye Nasrollah Khan, Tayyeblu, Asad Kikha'i, Golablu, Lek, Kezinlu, Korbikush, Vanda, Gowjelu, Charokhlu, Meshbi Siyar, Qabezlu, Abulqarlu, Qarajullu, Osmanlu, Rostami, and Jalallu.

=== Kashkollu / Kashkuli ===
During World War I, the Kashkuli khans supported the British in their struggle against Ṣowlat-al-Dowleh (Iyl-khan) and the German agent, Wilhelm Wassmuss. After the war, Ṣowlat-al-Dowleh punished the Kashkuli. He dismissed the Kashkuli leaders who had opposed him and "deliberately set out to break up and impoverish the Kashkuli tribe". Two sections of the tribe, which consisted of elements which had been loyal to Ṣowlat-al-Dowleh, were then separated from the main body of the tribe and given the status of independent tribes, becoming the Kashkuli Kuchak ("Little Kashkuli") and Qarachahi tribes. The remaining tribe became known as the Kashkuli Bozorg ("Big Kashkuli") tribe. The Kashkuli Bozorg tribe comprised 4,862 households in 1963. As Oliver Garrod observed, the Kashkuli Bozorg are "especially noted for their Jajims, or tartan woolen blankets, and for the fine quality of their rugs and trappings".

According to an Iranian army list of the tribes of Fars in 1958, the Kashkuli Bozorg consisted of the Begdili Lori, Begdili Torki, Goshtasp Lori, Goshtasp Torki, Jarkani, Guri Baha-al-Dini, Amaleh-ye Eliaskhani, Orukhlu, Kuruni, Jamaa Bozorgi, Ardeshiri, Zangana, Owlad Mirza'i, Bolvardi Soleymani, Bolvardi Kamandi, Korushi, Hahnavaz Khanlu, Chahardeh-Charik, Shashboluki, Gardani, Karim Khani, Uriyad wa Bollu, Al-e Qoyunlu, Amaleh-ye Fereydunkhani, Qarachahi, Salhu'i, Ali Askarlu, Ahmad Mahmudi, Farhadlu, Bolvardi Gardani, Guri Bumandi, Amaleh-ye Jehangir Khani, Tayyebi, Chelangar, Dizgani, Mohammad Saleh, Mishan, Vanda, Bolvardi Azdahakesh, Kohvada, Buger, and Yadkuri.

=== Eymur / Farsimadan ===
The Farsimadan claim that they are of Ḵhalaj origin, and that, before moving to southern Persia, they dwelled in Ḵhalajestan, a region southwest of Tehran. The tribe was already in Fars by the late 16th century, for it is known that in October 1590 their leader, Abul-Qasem Beyg and some of his followers were punished for having sided with Yaqub Khan the Zul-Qadr governor of Fars, in a revolt against Shah Abbas I. The population of the Farsimadan was estimated by Afshaar-Sistaani at 2,715 families or 12,394 individuals, in 1982.

Oberling listed the Farsimadan tribes as Qara Mir Shamlu, Tawabi', Owlad (the clan of the chief), Koranlu, Doghanlu, Kalbelu (Kalb-Alilu), Sheybanlu, Amaleh, Qasemlu, Gorja'i, Morol (Moghol), Machanlu, Mosullu, Zohrablu, and Yandranlu.

== Culture ==
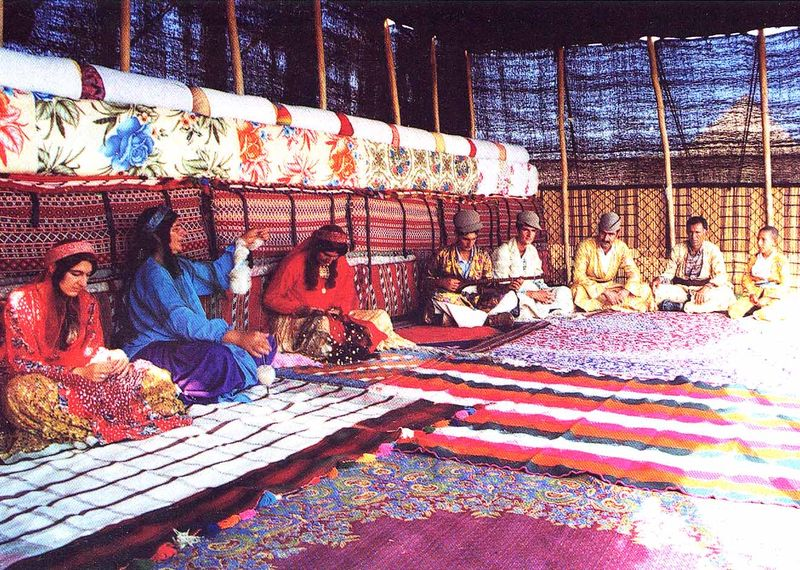
The interior of a Qashqai tent

The Qashqai are traditionally pastoral nomads who speak the Qashqai language. They rely on small-scale cultivation and shepherding. Traditional dress includes the use of decorated short tunics, wide-legged pants, and headscarves worn by women. Many Qashqais in Shiraz have become Persian-speaking.

=== Carpeting and weaving ===
The Qashqai are renowned for their pile carpets and other woven wool products, including the Qashqai Gelime, which received a UNESCO seal of authenticity in 2013. They are sometimes referred to as Shiraz was the major marketplace for them in the past. The wool produced in the mountains and valleys near Shiraz is exceptionally soft and beautiful and takes a deeper color than wool from other parts of Iran.

"No wool in all Persia takes such a rich and deep colour as the Shiraz wool. The deep blue and the dark ruby red are equally extraordinary, and that is due to the brilliancy of the wool, which is firmer and, so to say, more transparent than silk, and makes one think of translucent enamel".

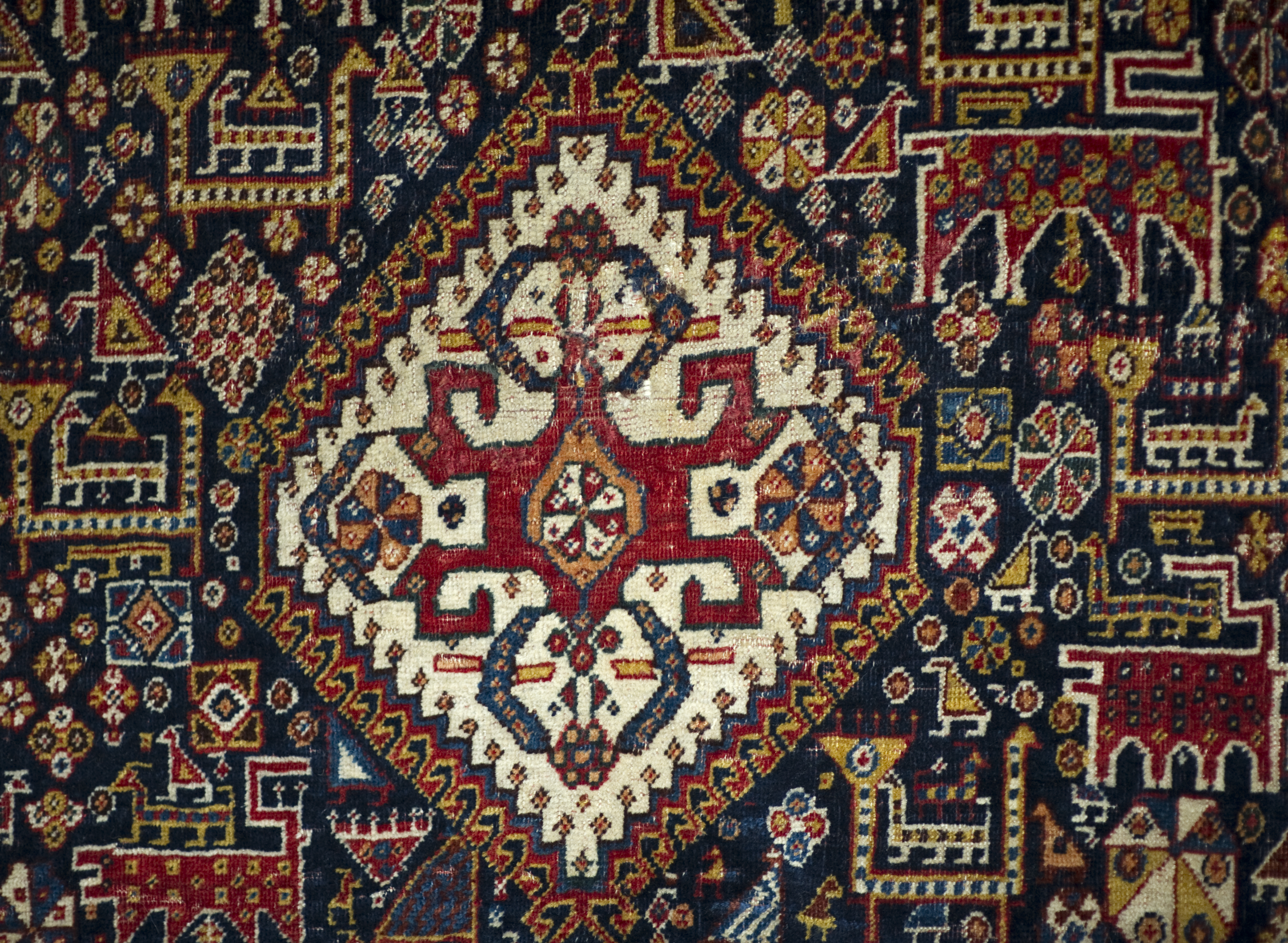
Central Medallion that is seen in rugs from the Qashqai people. Antique Rug from the Wovensouls collection, Singapore.

Qashqai carpets have been said to be "probably the most famous of all Persian tribal weavings". Qashqai saddlebags, adorned with colorful geometric designs, "are superior to any others made".

== Notable individuals ==
- Milad Beigi, taekwondo practitioner
- Ismail Khan Qashqai (born 1257 AH / 1295 AH – 1931), tribal leader
- Mohammad Bahmanbeigi (26 Bahman 1298 – 11 May 1389), writer and founder of nomadic education in Iran

== Cultural references ==
- In 2006, Nissan named its new European small SUV "Qashqai", after the Qashqai people. The designers believe that the buyers "will be nomadic in nature too".
- The everyday life of nomadic Qashqai people was portrayed in the 1996 Iranian film Gabbeh directed by Mohsen Makhmalbaf.

== See also ==
- Qashqai Football Club
- Ethnicities in Iran
- Bichaghchi
- Yörüks
