= Qashqai language =

Oghuz Turkic language of southwestern Iran

Qashqai
- Qashqay, Kashkai, Kashkay, Qashqayi
- قشقايی ديلى, Qaşqâyî dili
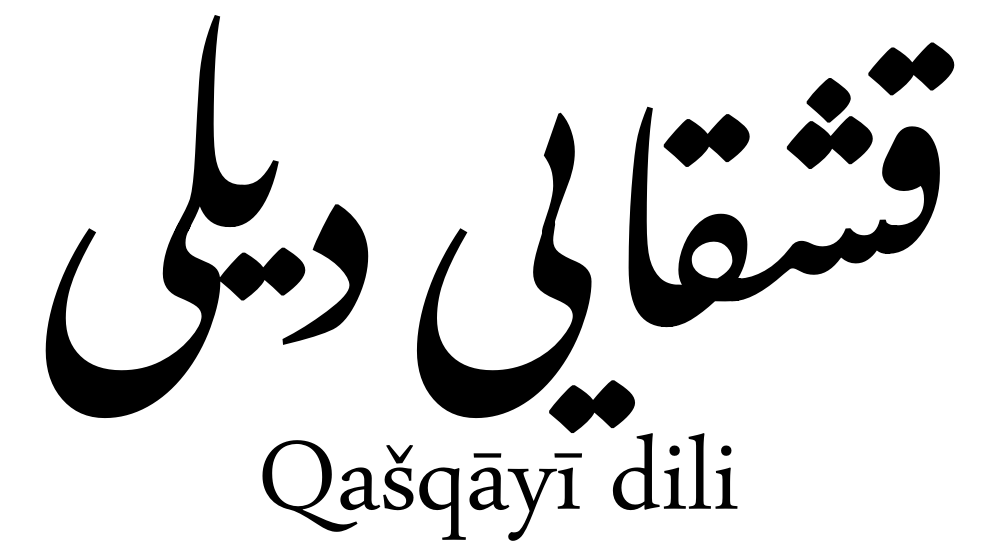
- Qashqai dili written in Nastaliq script and Latin script
- Native to: Iran
- Region: Fars, Isfahan, Bushehr, Chaharmahal and Bakhtiari, Kohgiluyeh and Boyer-Ahmad, Khuzestan
- Ethnicity: 2.0 million Qashqai (2021)
- Native speakers: 1.0 million (2021)
- Language family: Turkic: Common Turkic; Oghuz; Southern Oghuz; Qashqai
- Writing system: Persian alphabet

Language codes
- ISO 639-3: qxq
- Glottolog: qash1240
- Linguasphere: Part of 44-AAB-a

Qashqai (قشقایی ديلى, Qaşqâyî dili, pronounced in English as /ˈkæʃkaɪ/ KASH-ky, and also spelled Qaşqay, Qashqayi, Kashkai, Kashkay, Qašqāʾī and Qashqa'i or Kaşkay) is an Oghuz Turkic language spoken by the Qashqai people, an ethnic group living mainly in the Fars province of Southern Iran. Encyclopædia Iranica regards Qashqai as an independent third group of dialects within the Southwestern Turkic language group. It is known to speakers as Turki. Estimates of the number of Qashqai speakers vary. Ethnologue gave a figure of 1.0 million in 2021. It is usually written in the Nastaliq hand of the Perso-Arabic alphabet. It is closely related to Khorasani Turkic, Azeri, Turkish, Türkmen, Gagauz, and Chaharmahali Turkic.

The Qashqai language is closely related to Azerbaijani. However, some Qashqai varieties, namely the variety spoken in the Sheshbeyli tribe, share features with Turkish. In a sociopolitical sense, though, Qashqai is considered a language in its own right.

== Phonology ==
=== Consonants ===
Consonants of Qashqai
		Labial	Alveolar	Palatal	Velar	Uvular	Glottal
Nasal		m	n		ŋ		
Plosive/ Affricate	voiceless	p	t	t͡ʃ	k	q	(ʔ)
Plosive/ Affricate	voiced	b	d	d͡ʒ	ɡ		
Fricative	voiceless	f	s	ʃ		χ	h
Fricative	voiced	v ~ [w]	z	(ʒ)		ʁ	
Approximant		v ~ [w]	l	j			
Trill			r				

- Sounds /ʒ/ and /ʔ/ only occur as loan consonants from Persian and Arabic.
- Sounds /p, t, t͡ʃ, k/ mainly occur phonemically before consonants, but may occur as aspirated before vowels or in word-final position as [pʰ tʰ t͡ʃʰ kʰ].
- Sounds /z, ŋ, ʁ/ never occur in word-initial position, except in a few loan words.
- [w] only occurs as an intervocalic allophone of /v/ when occurring between two rounded vowels. It may also occur in vowel diphthongs as [ow].
- /ŋ/ and /ɡ/ can occur phonemically as [ɲ] and [ɟ] when preceding front vowels.
- /l/ may occur as two allophones; as [l̠ʲ] before front vowels, or as [ɫ] before back vowels.
- /r/ can have two allophones; as [ɾ] in word-initial and word-medial positions, or as [r̥] in word-final positions. In native words, /r/ rarely occurs word-initially.

=== Vowels ===
Vowels of Qashqai
	Front		Back	
Close	i	y	ɯ	u
Mid	e		o	
Mid	(ɛ)	œ		
Open	æ		ɑ	(ɒ)

- Vowels /y/ and /œ/ are used rather infrequently.
- /ɛ/ only occurs as a word-final variant of /æ/.
- /i/ is always realized in word-final position as [ɪ].
- /ɯ/ can be realized as [ɨ] in non-initial positions.
- /u/ mainly occurs as a centralized allophone [ʉ] when preceding palatal consonants.
- Vowel /ɑ/ is in free variation with its rounded equivalent /ɒ/, when occurring in front syllables.

== Syntax ==
Qashqai follows common Turkic syntax features: dependent marking, head-final within unmarked phrases, free word order with SOV preferred, agglutinative. Grammatical cases in Qashqai Turkic include: nominative, accusative, genitive, dative, locative, ablative, terminative, equative and instrumental.
