= Junqan =

City in Chaharmahal and Bakhtiari province, Iran

Junqan Persian: جونقان
- City
- Location within Iran
- Coordinates: 32°09′02″N 50°41′16″E
- Country: Iran
- Province: Chaharmahal and Bakhtiari
- County: Farsan
- District: Junqan

Population (2016)
  - Total: 14,433
- Time zone: UTC+3:30 (IRST)

Junqan (Persian: جونقان) (Note: Also romanized as Jūnaqān, Jūneqān, Jūnoqān, and Jūnqān; also known as Jooneghan) is a city in, and the capital of, Junqan District in Farsan County, Chaharmahal and Bakhtiari province, Iran.

== Demographics ==
=== Language ===
Three languages are spoken in Junqan: Turkic, Bakhtiari and Persian. The three together paint a picture of balanced multilingualism in the community; each is dominant in certain aspects and recessive in others. Turkic is numerically the city's dominant first language (L1)—unlike in the majority of the province where it is Bakhtiari—and is used together with Bakhtiari at home. Turkic is also used as the primary language in shared social contexts. Nevertheless, the majority of people in Junqan are equally skilled in both Bakhtari and Turkic, regardless of which language they speak at home.

Junqan's Turkic speakers refer to their language simply as "Torki" (Turkic/Turkish), but they do admit a connection to Qashqai Turkic of Fars province. Because Southern Lori, a close relative of Bakhtiari, is spoken alongside Qashqai Turkic in Fars, the term "Lori-ye Bakhtiyri" (Bakhtiari Lori), which is not frequently used for Bakhtiari elsewhere in Chaharmahal and Bakhtiari Province, may reflect a perception of the language situation influenced by the Turkic speakers' origin in that province.

Persian, the nation's official language, and both Turkic and Bakhtiari coexist in diglossic relationships in Junqan. Both groups are seeing a linguistic shift toward Persian as L1 at-home instruction of Persian is becoming more common among both communities, although it may be that the social blend of the city is acting as a catalyst.

=== Population ===
At the time of the 2006 National Census, the city's population was 14,660 in 3,437 households, when it was in the Central District. The following census in 2011 counted 14,800 people in 3,933 households, by which time the city had been separated from the district in the formation of Junqan District. The 2016 census measured the population of the city as 14,433 people in 4,154 households.
