= Junqan District =

District in Chaharmahal and Bakhtiari province, Iran

Junqan District Persian: بخش جونقان
- District
- Location within Iran
- Coordinates: 32°10′N 50°38′E
- Country: Iran
- Province: Chaharmahal and Bakhtiari
- County: Farsan
- Established: 2011
- Capital: Junqan

Population (2016)
  - Total: 34,876
- Time zone: UTC+3:30 (IRST)

Junqan District (Persian: بخش جونقان) is in Farsan County, Chaharmahal and Bakhtiari province, Iran. Its capital is the city of Junqan.

== History ==
In 2011, Mizdej-e Sofla Rural District and the city of Junqan were separated from the Central District in the formation of Junqan District. In addition, the village of Pardanjan was converted to a city. The village of Cholicheh also became a city in 2013.

== Demographics ==
=== Population ===
At the time of the 2011 census, the district's population was 35,166 people in 9,487 households. The 2016 census measured the population of the district as 34,876 inhabitants living in 9,944 households.

=== Administrative divisions ===
Junqan District Population
Administrative Divisions	2011	2016
Junqan RD	1,225	2,750
Mizdej-e Sofla RD	11,053	4,049
Cholicheh (city)		4,945
Junqan (city)	14,800	14,433
Pardanjan (city)	8,088	8,699
Total	35,166	34,876
RD = Rural District
