= Babaheydar District =

District in Chaharmahal and Bakhtiari province, Iran

Babaheydar District Persian: بخش بابا حيدر
- District
- Location within Iran
- Coordinates: 32°19′N 50°27′E
- Country: Iran
- Province: Chaharmahal and Bakhtiari
- County: Farsan
- Established: 2011
- Capital: Babaheydar

Population (2016)
  - Total: 18,917
- Time zone: UTC+3:30 (IRST)

Babaheydar District (Persian: بخش بابا حيدر) is in Farsan County, Chaharmahal and Bakhtiari province, Iran. Its capital is the city of Babaheydar.

== History ==
In 2011, villages were separated from the Central District in the formation of Babaheydar District. The city of Babaheydar was transferred from the Central District to Babaheydar District. The village of Filabad was elevated to the status of a city in 2019.

== Demographics ==
=== Population ===
At the time of the 2011 National Census, the district's population was 8,770 people in 2,343 households. The 2016 census measured the population of the district as 18,917 inhabitants living in 5,478 households.

=== Administrative divisions ===
Babaheydar District Population
Administrative Divisions	2011	2016
Sarab-e Olya RD	1,623	1,302
Sarab-e Sofla RD	7,147	6,413
Babaheydar (city)		11,202
Filabad (city) (Note: Became a city after the 2016 census)		
Total	8,770	18,917
RD = Rural District
