= Mizdej-e Sofla Rural District =

Rural district in Chaharmahal and Bakhtiari province, Iran

Mizdej-e Sofla Rural District Persian: دهستان ميزدج سفلي
- Rural District
- Location within Iran
- Coordinates: 32°13′N 50°36′E
- Country: Iran
- Province: Chaharmahal and Bakhtiari
- County: Farsan
- District: Junqan
- Established: 1987
- Capital: Cholicheh

Population (2016)
  - Total: 4,049
- Time zone: UTC+3:30 (IRST)

Mizdej-e Sofla Rural District (Persian: دهستان ميزدج سفلي) is in Junqan District of Farsan County, Chaharmahal and Bakhtiari province, Iran. It is administered from the city of Cholicheh.

== Demographics ==
=== Population ===
At the time of the 2006 National Census, the rural district's population (as a part of the Central District) was 23,944 in 5,358 households. There were 11,053 inhabitants in 3,062 households at the following census of 2011, by which time the rural district had been separated from the district in the formation of Junqan District. The 2016 census measured the population of the rural district as 4,049 in 1,193 households. Its only village was Karan, with 4,049 people.
