= Mizdej-e Olya Rural District =

Rural district in Chaharmahal and Bakhtiari province, Iran

Mizdej-e Olya Rural District Persian: دهستان ميزدج عليا
- Rural District
- Location within Iran
- Coordinates: 32°15′N 50°31′E
- Country: Iran
- Province: Chaharmahal and Bakhtiari
- County: Farsan
- District: Central
- Established: 1987
- Capital: Gujan

Population (2016)
  - Total: 4,810
- Time zone: UTC+3:30 (IRST)

Mizdej-e Olya Rural District (Persian: دهستان ميزدج عليا) is in the Central District of Farsan County, Chaharmahal and Bakhtiari province, Iran. It is administered from the city of Gujan. The rural district was previously administered from the city of Babaheydar.

== Demographics ==
=== Population ===
At the time of the 2006 National Census, the rural district's population was 14,366 in 3,173 households. There were 10,893 inhabitants in 2,848 households at the following census of 2011. The 2016 census measured the population of the rural district as 4,810 in 1,312 households. The most populous of its three villages was Deh Cheshmeh, with 4,510 people.

=== Other villages in the rural district ===
- Bid Gol
- Chubin
