= Farsan County =

County in Chaharmahal and Bakhtiari province, Iran

Farsan County Persian: شهرستان فارسان
- County
- Location of Farsan County in Chaharmahal and Bakhtiari province (center purple, pink)

- Location of Chaharmahal and Bakhtiari province in Iran
- Coordinates: 32°13′N 50°35′E
- Country: Iran
- Province: Chaharmahal and Bakhtiari
- Capital: Farsan
- Districts: Central, Babaheydar, Junqan

Population (2016)
  - Total: 95,286
- Time zone: UTC+3:30 (IRST)

Farsan County (Persian: شهرستان فارسان) is in Chaharmahal and Bakhtiari province, Iran. Its capital is the city of Farsan.

== History ==
In 2011, Mizdej-e Sofla Rural District and the city of Junqan were separated from the Central District in the formation of Junqan District, which was divided into two rural districts, including the new Junqan Rural District. In addition, the village of Pardanjan became a city, and Babaheydar District was formed and divided into Sarab-e Olya and Sarab-e Sofla Rural Districts.

In 2013, the city of Babaheydar was transferred from the Central District to Babaheydar District, and the villages of Cholicheh and Gujan were converted to cities. The village of Filabad became a city in 2019.

== Demographics ==
=== Population ===
At the time of the 2006 National Census, the county's population was 90,111 in 19,878 households. The following census in 2011 counted 93,941 people in 24,747 households. The 2016 census measured the population of the county as 95,286, in 26,914 households.

=== Administrative divisions ===
Farsan County's population history and administrative structure over three consecutive censuses are shown in the following table.

Farsan County Population
Administrative Divisions	2006	2011	2016
Central District	90,111	50,005	41,493
Mizdej-e Olya RD	14,366	10,893	4,810
Mizdej-e Sofla RD	23,944		
Babaheydar (city)	10,922	11,099	
Farsan (city)	26,219	28,013	30,504
Gujan (city)			6,179
Junqan (city)	14,660		
Babaheydar District		8,770	18,917
Sarab-e Olya RD		1,623	1,302
Sarab-e Sofla RD		7,147	6,413
Babaheydar (city)			11,202
Filabad (city) (Note: Became a city after the 2016 census)			
Junqan District		35,166	34,876
Junqan RD		1,225	2,750
Mizdej-e Sofla RD		11,053	4,049
Cholicheh (city)			4,945
Junqan (city)		14,800	14,433
Pardanjan (city)		8,088	8,699
Total	90,111	93,941	95,286
RD = Rural District

== See also ==
Media related to Farsan County at Wikimedia Commons
