= Central District (Farsan County) =

District in Chaharmahal and Bakhtiari province, Iran

Central District (Farsan County) Persian: بخش مرکزی شهرستان فارسان
- District
- Location within Iran
- Coordinates: 32°15′N 50°31′E
- Country: Iran
- Province: Chaharmahal and Bakhtiari
- County: Farsan
- Capital: Farsan

Population (2016)
  - Total: 41,493
- Time zone: UTC+3:30 (IRST)

The Central District of Farsan County (Persian: بخش مرکزی شهرستان فارسان) is in Chaharmahal and Bakhtiari province, Iran. Its capital is the city of Farsan.

== History ==
In 2011, Mizdej-e Sofla Rural District and the city of Junqan were separated from the district in the formation of Junqan District. Villages were separated from the Central District to form Babaheydar District. In 2013, the city of Babaheydar was transferred from the Central District to Babaheydar District, and the village of Gujan was converted to a city.

== Demographics ==
=== Population ===
At the time of the 2006 National Census, the district's population was 90,111 in 19,878 households. The following census in 2011 counted 50,005 people in 12,935 households. The 2016 census measured the population of the district as 41,493 inhabitants living in 11,492 households.

=== Administrative divisions ===
Central District (Farsan County) Population
Administrative Divisions	2006	2011	2016
Mizdej-e Olya RD	14,366	10,893	4,810
Mizdej-e Sofla RD (Note: Transferred to Junqan District)	23,944		
Babaheydar (Note: Transferred to Babaheydar District) (city)	10,922	11,099	
Farsan (city)	26,219	28,013	30,504
Gujan (city)			6,179
Junqan (city)	14,660		
Total	90,111	50,005	41,493
RD = Rural District
