= Chaharmahal and Bakhtiari province =

Province of Iran

Chaharmahal and Bakhtiari Province استان چهارمحال و بختیاری (Persian)
- Province
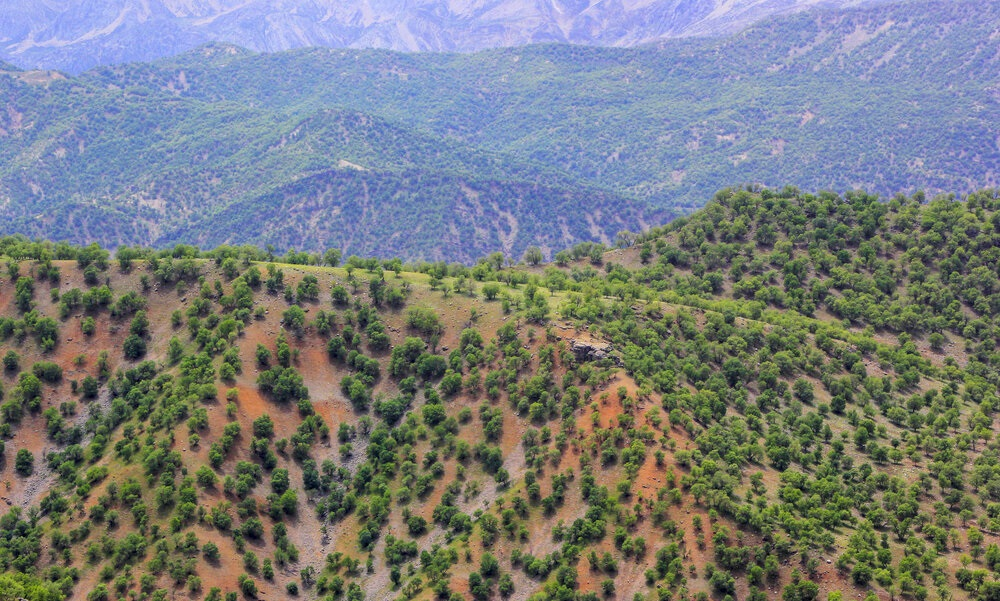
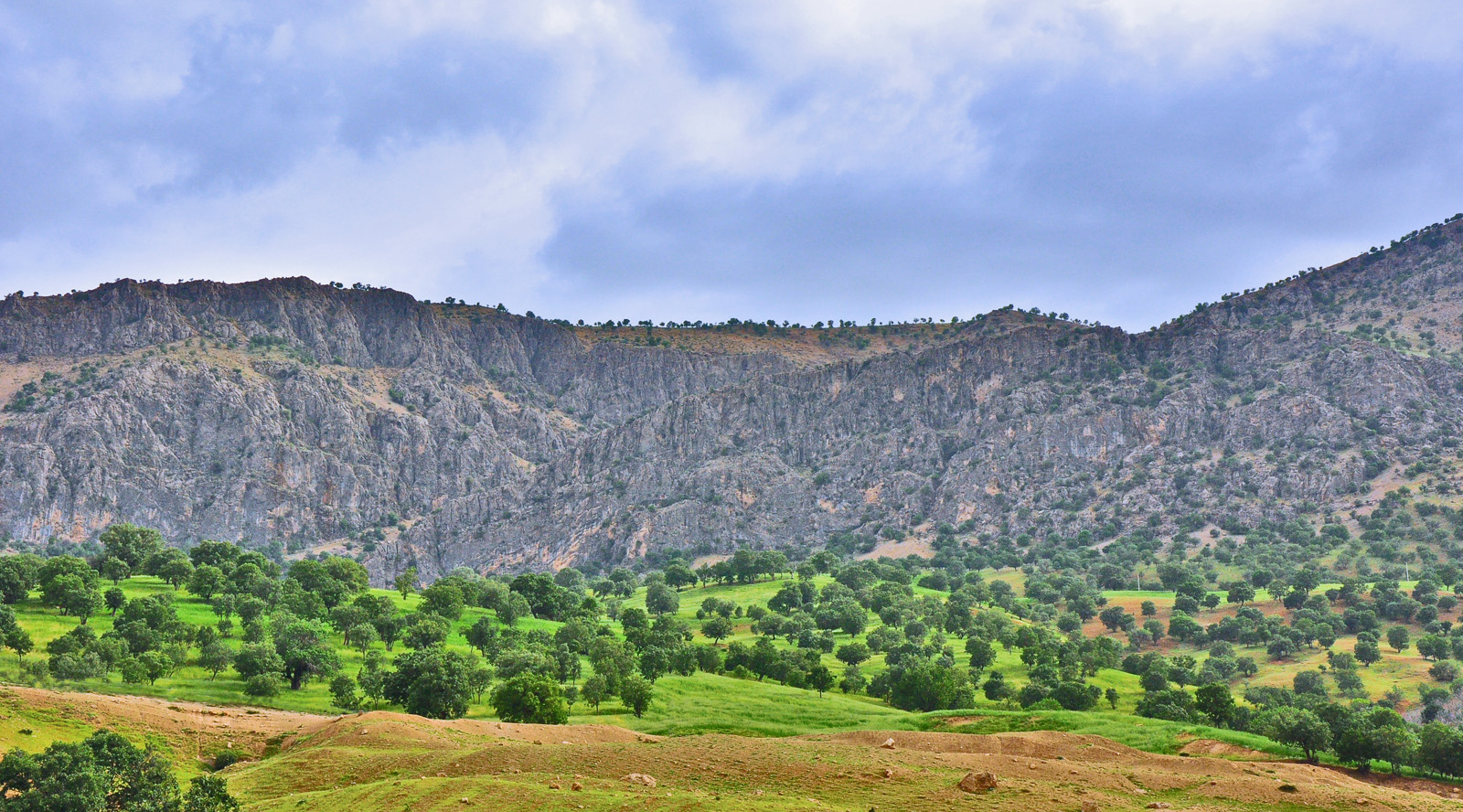
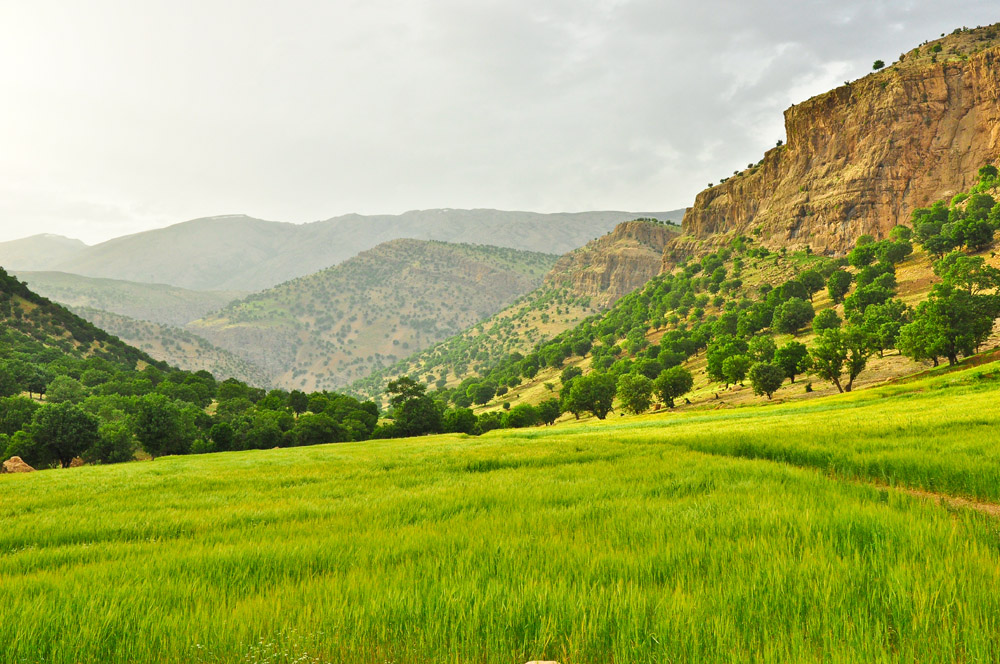
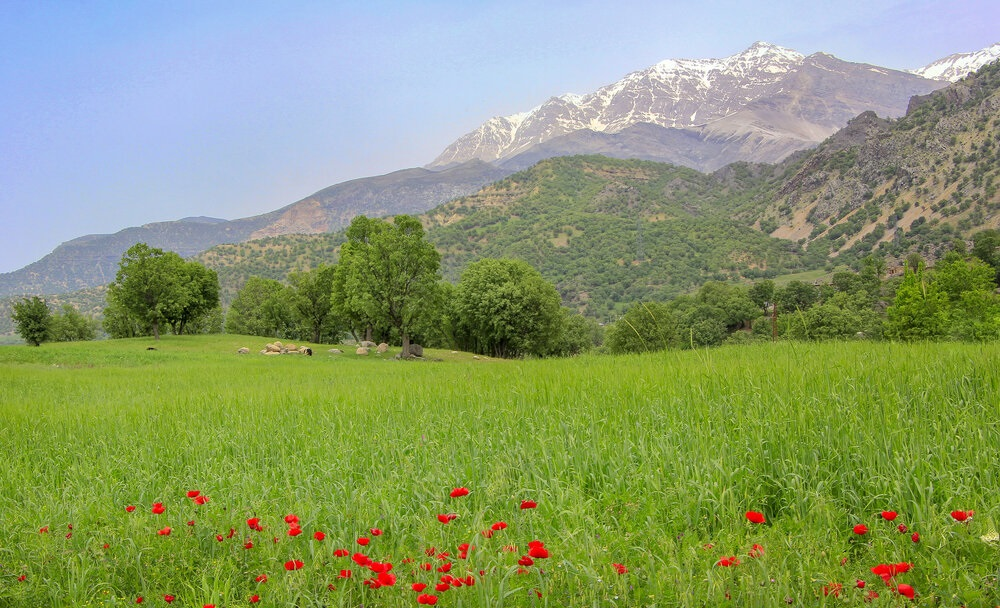
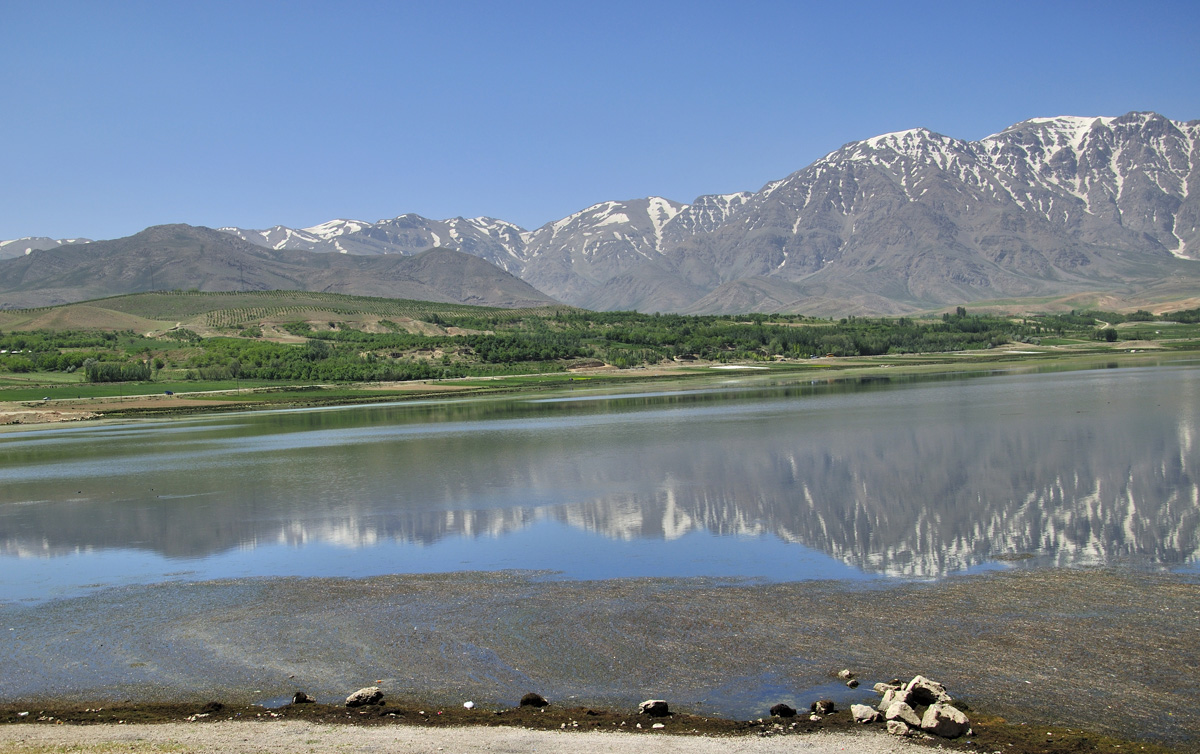
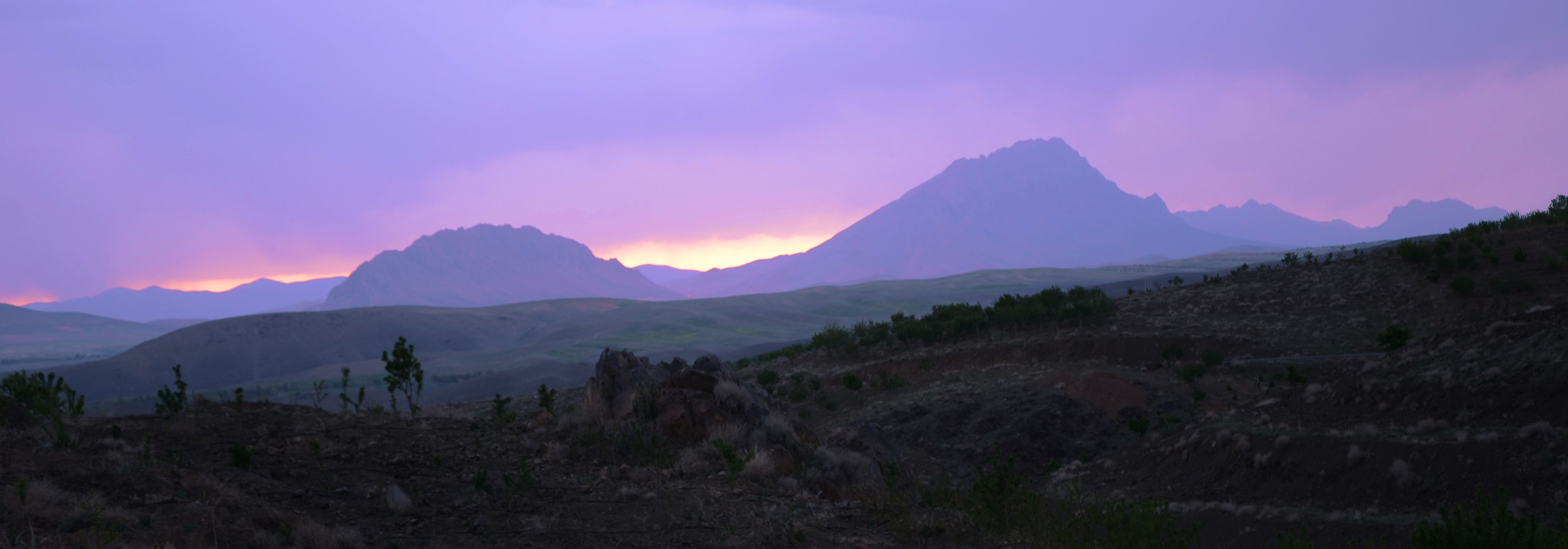

- Location of Chaharmahal and Bakhtiari province within Iran
- Coordinates: 31°58′N 50°29′E
- Country: Iran
- Region: Region 2
- Capital: Shahr-e Kord
- Counties: 12

Government
  - Governor-general: Jafar Mardani (Independent)

Area
  - Total: 16,332 km^{2} (6,306 sq mi)

Population (2016)
  - Total: 947,763
  - Density: 58.031/km^{2} (150.30/sq mi)
- Time zone: UTC+03:30 (IRST)
- Main language(s): Luri language Persian; Qashqai Turkish
- HDI (2017): 0.798 high · 13th

Chaharmahal and Bakhtiari Province (Persian: استان چهارمحال و بختیاری) (Note: Also romanized as Ostân-e Čahâr-Mahâl-o Baxtiyâri) is one of the 31 provinces of Iran. Its capital is the city of Shahr-e Kord. The province lies in the southwest of the country, with an area of 16,332 square kilometers.

The province was classified as part of Region 2 upon the division of the provinces into 5 regions solely for coordination and development purposes on June 22, 2014.

Chaharmahal and Bakhtiari Province lies in the heart of the Zagros Mountains, a mountain range that stretches across north-western Iran and forms a natural barrier between Iran and Iraq.

== Demographics ==
=== Languages ===
Bakhtiāri, which belongs to the Luri language of the Iranian language family, is the province's main language. Bakhtiāri is primarily spoken in the valleys of the higher areas in the western half of the province. It is also spoken in the lower areas around Lordegān in the south, and by speakers who have moved into the cities in the north-east.

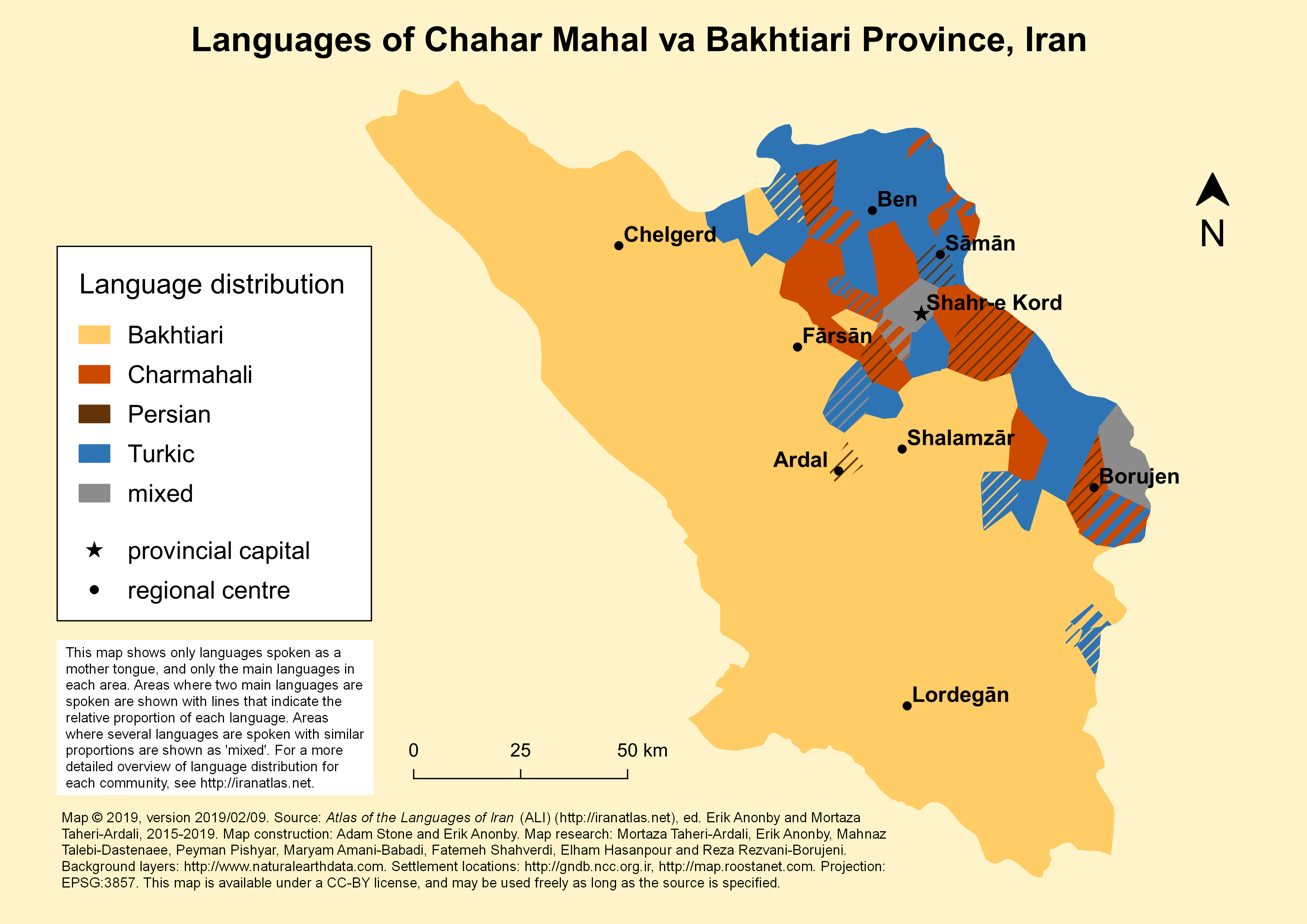
Linguistic map of Chahar Mahal va Bakhtiari province

In the north-east quarter of the province, people in most cities and villages speak either Chārmahāli (also in the Southwestern branch of Iranian) or Chaharmahali Turkic. Chārmahāli is transitional between Bakhtiari and Persian varieties of Isfahan province, but more similar to the latter. Chārmahāli varieties spoken in cities include Dehkordi (in Shahr-e Kord), Ghafarrokhi (in Farrokh Shahr), Heysheguni (in Hafshejān), and Borujeni (in Borujen). There are also many other varieties of Chārmahāli spoken in rural areas.

Most types of Turkic spoken in this province are similar to Qashqa'i of Fars province, but they are transitional to the Āzarbāyjāni (Azerbaijani) language of north-west Iran. The Chārmahāli and Turkic language areas overlap with one another, and in the foothills of the Zagros and in the larger cities, they intermingle with Bakhtiāri as well.

Tehrani-type Persian is now being taught by parents to children as a first language in some parts of the province, with the highest concentrations in the cities. This statistic is based on the population statistics of 2013.

Chaharmahal and Bakhtiari Linguistic Composition
language	percent
Luri	61.88%
Persian	20.3%
Turkic	17.80%
Other, mixed	0.02%

The Atlas of the Languages of Iran (ALI) published a series of language maps for Chahar Mahal and Bakhtiari province, including a point-based and polygon (area-based) language distribution maps, and several linguistic data maps.

Written descriptions of some of the Bakhtiāri varieties in the province. and a lexicon of the Bakhtiāri language have also been published.

=== Population ===
At the time of the 2006 National Census, the province's population was 843,784 in 194,171 households. The following census in 2011 counted 895,263 people in 234,416 households. The 2016 census measured the population of the province as 947,763 in 270,434 households.

=== Administrative divisions ===

The population history and structural changes of Chaharmahal and Bakhtiari province's administrative divisions over three consecutive censuses are shown in the following table.

Chaharmahal and Bakhtiari Province
Counties	2006	2011	2016
Ardal	68,740	53,514	48,880
Ben (Note: Separated from Shahrekord County after the 2011 census)	—	—	28,326
Borujen	113,795	118,681	122,483
Falard (Note: Separated from Lordegan County after the 2016 census)	—	—	—
Farrokhshahr (Note: Separated from Shahrekord County after the 2016 census)	—	—	—
Farsan	90,111	93,941	95,286
Khanmirza (Note: Separated from Lordegan County after the 2016 census)	—	—	—
Kiar (Note: Separated from Ardal County and Shahrekord County after the 2006 census)	—	58,047	50,976
Kuhrang	33,468	35,915	41,535
Lordegan	175,289	194,783	209,681
Saman	—	—	34,616
Shahrekord	362,381	340,382	315,980
Total	843,784	895,263	947,763

=== Cities ===
According to the 2016 census, 607,444 people (over 64% of the population of Chaharmahal and Bakhtiari province) live in the following cities:

City	Population
Aluni	5,248
Ardal	10,113
Babaheydar	11,202
Bazoft	1,519
Ben	12,971
Boldaji	11,980
Borujen	57,071
Chelgerd	2,989
Cholicheh	4,945
Dashtak	4,016
Dastana	5,143
Faradonbeh	13,317
Farrokh Shahr	31,739
Farsan	30,504
Gahru	6,263
Gandoman	6,291
Gujan	6,179
Hafshejan	21,352
Haruni	3,601
Junqan	14,433
Kaj	4,227
Kian	12,948
Lordegan	40,528
Mal-e Khalifeh	4,024
Manj	1,492
Nafech	4,059
Naghan	6,125
Naqneh	9,923
Pardanjan	8,699
Saman	14,192
Samsami	1,203
Sar Khun	2,131
Sardasht	5,691
Sefiddasht	5,471
Shahrekord	190,441
Shamsabad	2,609
Shalamzar	6,899
Sudjan	5,581
Sureshjan	12,308
Taqanak	6,170
Vardanjan	4,456

== Economy ==
The province is mainly active in the agriculture sector. Most of the industrial sector is clustered around the center of the province.

== Natural attractions ==
Chaharmahal and Bakhtiari province is the source and birthplace of many springs, rivers and waterfalls that supply the water of the two great and vital rivers of Zayanderud and Karoon and cause the development of many cities in the country. Natural attractions include Zayanderud river, Zamankhan bridge, Kouhrang 1 Dam, Dime spring, Sheik Ali Khan waterfall, Chama Ice cave, Darkesh varkesh canyon, Rostam Abad Sardab spring, Do Polan, Karoon-4 dam, Darreh Esgh (love valley), Atashgah waterfall, Choghakhor Wetland, Pire Ghar cave, Siasard spring, Helen protected area, Barm spring, Sendegan spring, Tang Sayyad national Park, Parvaz national park, Sarab cave, Gandoman wetland, Zard lime waterfall, Kordikon waterfall.

== Colleges and universities ==
- Islamic Azad University of Borujen
- Islamic Azad University, Shahrekord Branch
- Shahrekord University
- Shahrekord University of Medical Sciences

== See also ==
- Media related to Chaharmahal and Bakhtiari Province at Wikimedia Commons
