= Uch Boghaz =

Uch Boghaz اوچ بغاز
- Village
- Location within Iran
- Coordinates: 32°26′57″N 50°26′42″E
- Country: Iran
- Province: Chaharmahal and Bakhtiari
- County: Shahrekord
- Bakhsh: Laran
- Rural District: Margh Malek

Population (2006)
  - Total: 106
- Time zone: UTC+3:30 (IRST)
  - Summer (DST): UTC+4:30 (IRDT)

Uch Boghaz (Persian: اوچ بغاز, also Romanized as Ūch Boghāz; also known as Āghcheh Būghāz, Āghjeh Bowghāz, Āghjeh Būghāz, Ūj Boghāz, and ‘Ūj Boqaz) is a village in Margh Malek Rural District, Laran District, Shahrekord County, Chaharmahal and Bakhtiari Province, Iran. At the 2006 census, its population was 106, in 25 families. The village is populated by Turkic people.
