= Sirak, Chaharmahal and Bakhtiari =

Sirak سیرک هفشجان
- Village
- Location within Iran
- Coordinates: 32°12′40″N 50°49′05″E
- Country: Iran
- Province: Chaharmahal and Bakhtiari
- County: Shahrekord
- Bakhsh: Central
- Rural District: Taqanak

Population (2006)
  - Total: 310
- Time zone: UTC+3:30 (IRST)
  - Summer (DST): UTC+4:30 (IRDT)

Sirak (Persian: سيرك, also Romanized as Sīrak and Sirk) is a village in Taqanak Rural District, in the Central District of Shahrekord County, Chaharmahal and Bakhtiari Province, Iran. At the 2006 census, its population was 310, in 79 families. The village is populated by Persians.
