= Aqbolagh, Shahrekord =

Aqbolagh آقبلاغ
- Village
- Location within Iran
- Coordinates: 32°22′50″N 50°39′53″E
- Country: Iran
- Province: Chaharmahal and Bakhtiari
- County: Shahrekord
- Bakhsh: Laran
- Rural District: Lar

Population (2006)
  - Total: 343
- Time zone: UTC+3:30 (IRST)
  - Summer (DST): UTC+4:30 (IRDT)

Aqbolagh (Persian: آقبلاغ, also Romanized as Aqbolagh; also known as Aqbolagh and Aqbalagh Lar) is a village in Lar Rural District, Laran District, Shahrekord County, Chaharmahal and Bakhtiari Province, Iran. At the 2006 census, its population was 343, in 92 families. The village is populated by Persians people minority.

One of the best sites for star watching

grape of this region is popular for its special taste
