= Chaleshtar =

Neighborhood in Chaharmahal and Bakhtiari province, Iran

Chaleshtar Persian: چالشتر
- Neighborhood
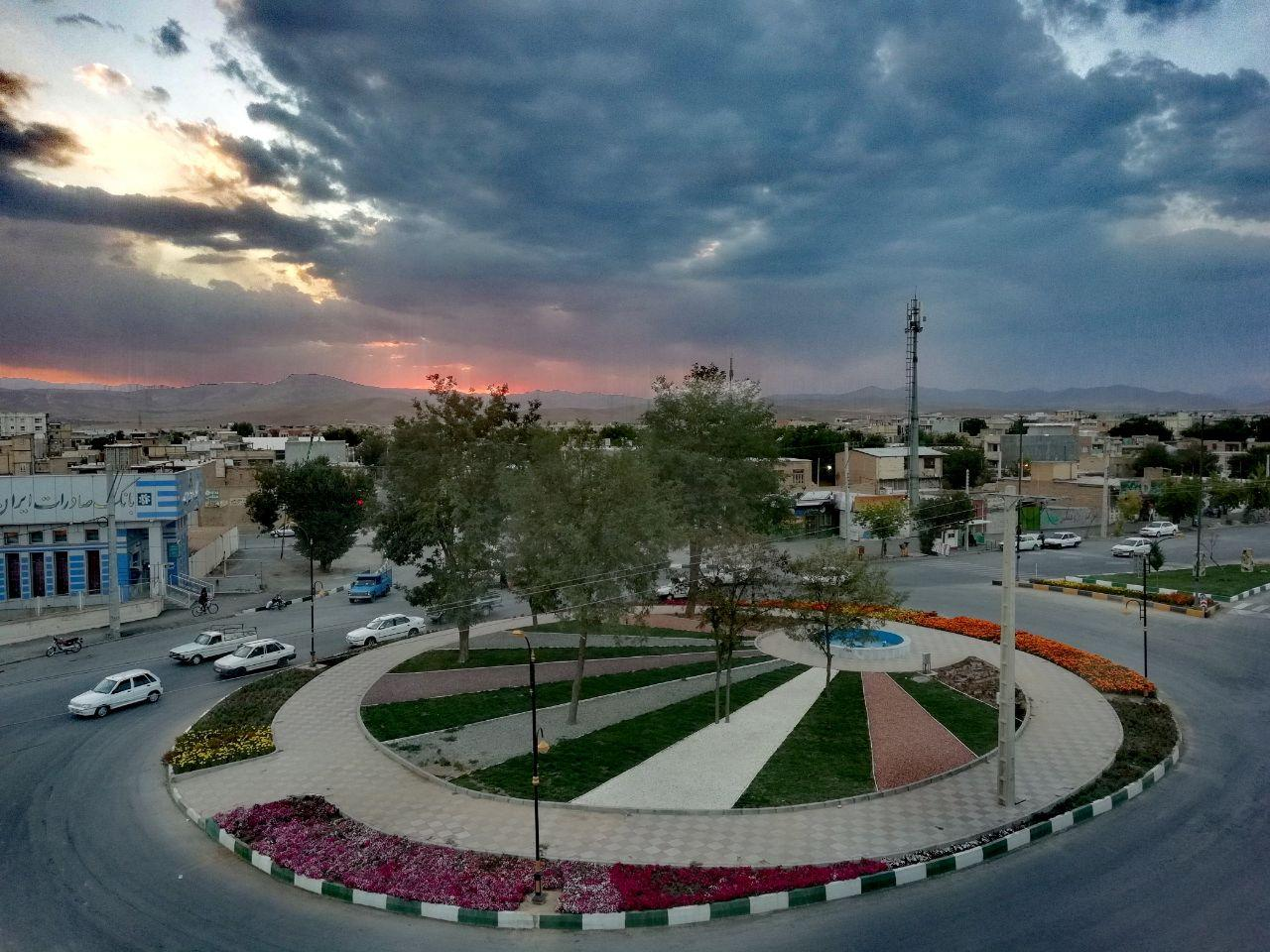

- Location within Iran
- Coordinates: 32°22′38″N 50°47′26″E
- Country: Iran
- Province: Chaharmahal and Bakhtiari
- County: Shahrekord
- District: Central
- City: Shahr-e Kord

Population (2006)
  - Total: 6,720
- Time zone: UTC+3:30 (IRST)

Chaleshtar (Persian: چالشتر) (Note: Also romanized as Chāl Shotor, Chaleshtor, and Chāleshtor) is a neighborhood in the city of Shahr-e Kord in the Central District of Shahrekord County, Chaharmahal and Bakhtiari province, Iran. It was the capital of Howmeh Rural District until its administration was transferred to the city of Nafech.

== Demographics ==
=== Ethnicity ===
The neighborhood is Luri-speaking, being the prominent heritage language, and there is a minority of Azeri speakers.

=== Population ===
At the time of the 2006 National Census, Chaleshtar's population was 6,720 in 1,680 households, when it was a village in Howmeh Rural District. After the census, the village was absorbed by the city of Shahr-e Kord.

== Climate ==
Climate data for Chlaeshtor(elevation: 1867m, 1996-2012 precipitation normals)
Month	Jan	Feb	Mar	Apr	May	Jun	Jul	Aug	Sep	Oct	Nov	Dec	Year
Average precipitation mm (inches)	56.5 (2.22)	56.5 (2.22)	62.3 (2.45)	44.1 (1.74)	9.4 (0.37)	2.7 (0.11)	0.8 (0.03)	0.8 (0.03)	0.7 (0.03)	6.6 (0.26)	47.4 (1.87)	62.7 (2.47)	350.5 (13.8)
Source: Chaharmahalmet

== Notable people ==
- Taghi Riahi
