= Mohammadabad, Chaharmahal and Bakhtiari =

Mohammadabad محمداباد
- Village
- Location within Iran
- Coordinates: 32°15′17″N 50°39′31″E
- Country: Iran
- Province: Chaharmahal and Bakhtiari
- County: Shahrekord
- Bakhsh: Laran
- Rural District: Lar

Population (2006)
  - Total: 18
- Time zone: UTC+3:30 (IRST)
  - Summer (DST): UTC+4:30 (IRDT)

Mohammadabad (Persian: محمداباد, also Romanized as Moḩammadābād) is a village in Lar Rural District, Laran District, Shahrekord County, Chaharmahal and Bakhtiari Province, Iran. At the 2006 census, its population was 18, in 5 families.
