= Katak, Chaharmahal and Bakhtiari =

Katak كتك
- Village
- Location within Iran
- Coordinates: 32°24′12″N 50°36′26″E
- Country: Iran
- Province: Chaharmahal and Bakhtiari
- County: Shahrekord
- Bakhsh: Laran
- Rural District: Lar

Population (2006)
  - Total: 201
- Time zone: UTC+3:30 (IRST)
  - Summer (DST): UTC+4:30 (IRDT)

Katak (Persian: كتك, also Romanized as Kotok) is a village in Lar Rural District, Laran District, Shahrekord County, Chaharmahal and Bakhtiari Province, Iran, located about 35 kilometres (22 miles) north west of Shahrekord County. At the 2006 census, its population was 201, in 49 families. The village is populated by Persians.

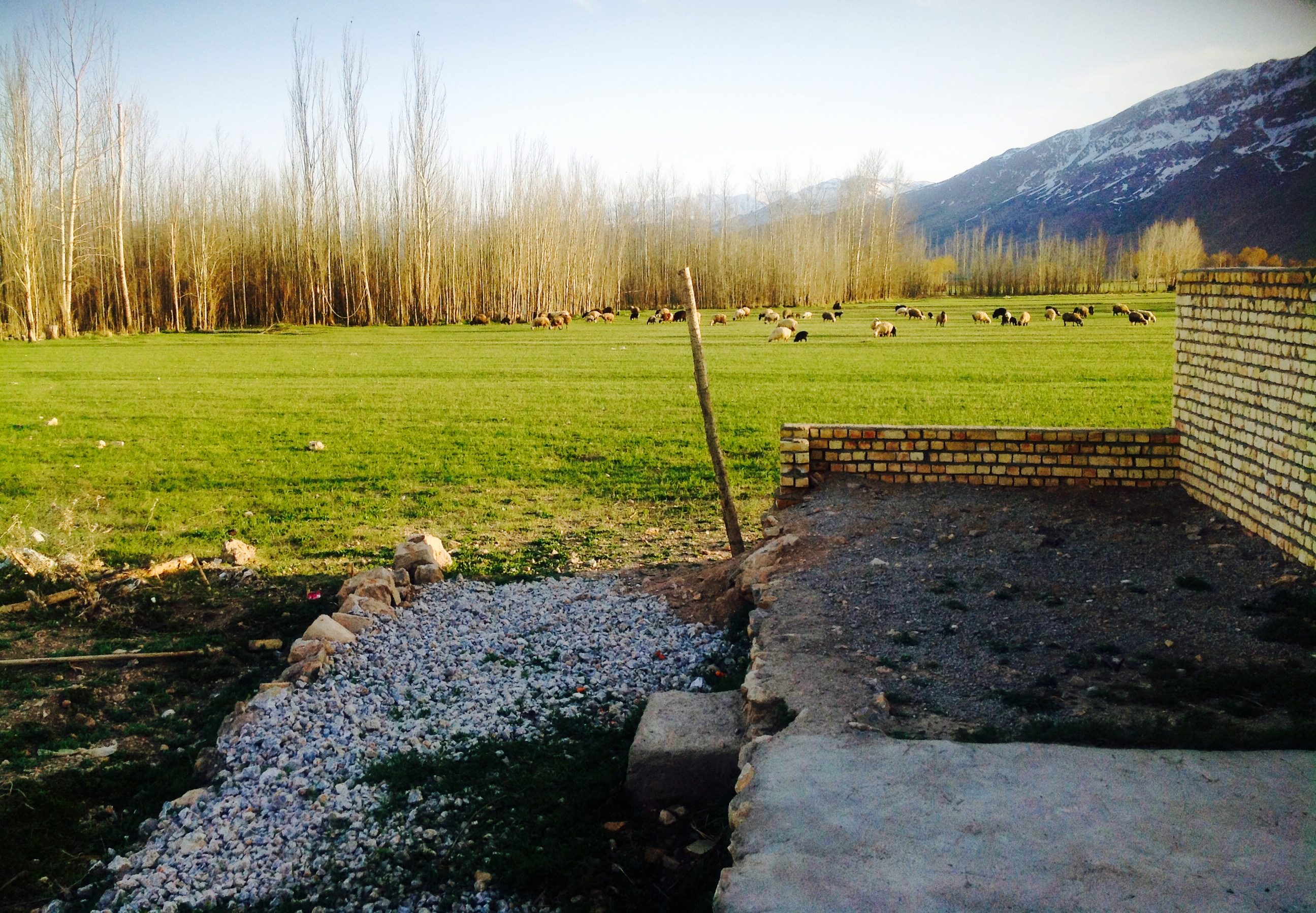
nice sunny morning in katak
