= Fathabad, Chaharmahal and Bakhtiari =

Fathabad فتح اباد
- Village
- Location within Iran
- Coordinates: 32°21′03″N 50°41′22″E
- Country: Iran
- Province: Chaharmahal and Bakhtiari
- County: Shahrekord
- Bakhsh: Laran
- Rural District: Lar

Population (2006)
  - Total: 228
- Time zone: UTC+3:30 (IRST)
  - Summer (DST): UTC+4:30 (IRDT)

Fathabad (Persian: فتح اباد, also Romanized as Fatḩābād) is a village in Lar Rural District, Laran District, Shahrekord County, Chaharmahal and Bakhtiari Province, Iran. At the 2006 census, its population was 228, in 61 families. The village is populated by Persians with a minority of Turkic peoples.
