= Margh Malek =

Village in Chaharmahal and Bakhtiari province, Iran

Margh Malek Persian: مرغملك
- Village
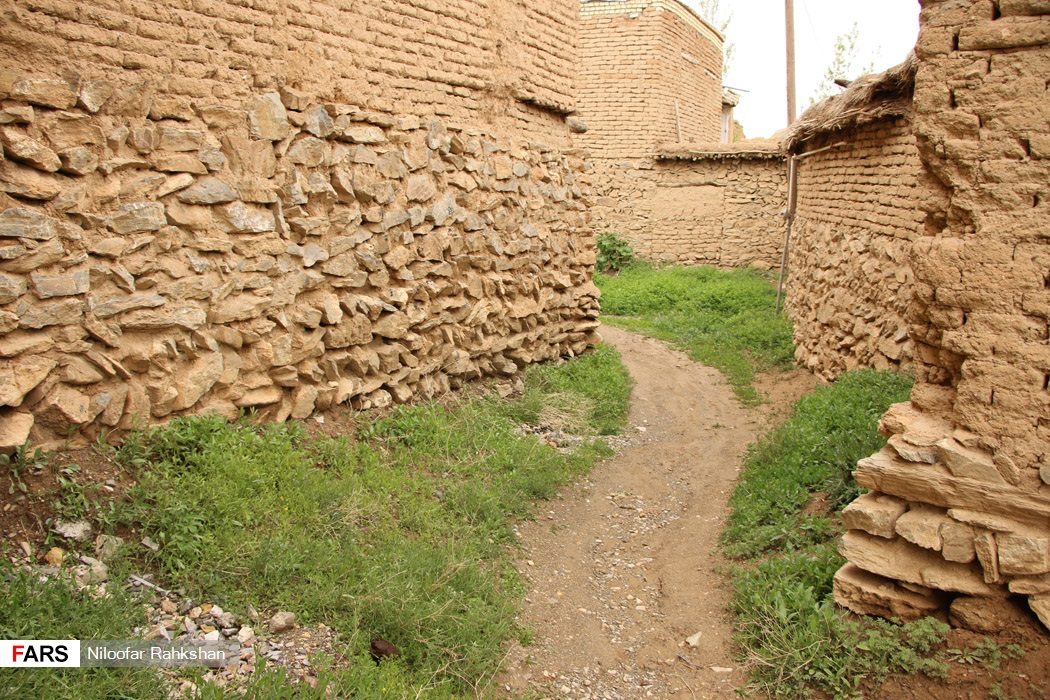

- Location within Iran
- Coordinates: 32°28′38″N 50°30′15″E
- Country: Iran
- Province: Chaharmahal and Bakhtiari
- County: Shahrekord
- District: Laran
- Rural District: Margh Malek

Population (2016)
  - Total: 1,729
- Time zone: UTC+3:30 (IRST)

Margh Malek (Persian: مرغملك) (Note: Also romanized as Margh-e Malek; also known as Margheh Malek, Margh-ī-Malīk, and Morq Malek) is a village in, and the capital of, Margh Malek Rural District in Laran District of Shahrekord County, Chaharmahal and Bakhtiari province, Iran.

== Demographics ==
=== Ethnicity ===
The village is populated by Turkic people.

=== Population ===
At the time of the 2006 National Census, the village's population was 2,236 in 564 households. The following census in 2011 counted 1,982 people in 586 households. The 2016 census measured the population of the village as 1,729 people in 547 households. It was the most populous village in its rural district.
