= Nowabad, Chaharmahal and Bakhtiari =

Village in Chaharmahal and Bakhtiari province, Iran

Nowabad Persian: نوآباد
- Village
- Location within Iran
- Coordinates: 32°12′32″N 50°48′29″E
- Country: Iran
- Province: Chaharmahal and Bakhtiari
- County: Shahrekord
- District: Central
- Rural District: Taqanak

Population (2016)
  - Total: 682
- Time zone: UTC+3:30 (IRST)

Nowabad (Persian: نوآباد) (Note: Also romanized as Nowābād; also known as Nūrābād) is a village in Taqanak Rural District (Note: Formerly Hafshejan Rural District) of the Central District in Shahrekord County, Chaharmahal and Bakhtiari province, Iran.

== Demographics ==
=== Ethnicity ===
The village is populated by Persians.

=== Population ===
At the time of the 2006 National Census, the village's population was 699 in 191 households. The following census in 2011 counted 712 people in 204 households. The 2016 census measured the population of the village as 682 people in 210 households.
