= Khvoy, Chaharmahal and Bakhtiari =

Village in Chaharmahal and Bakhtiari province, Iran

Khvoy Persian: خوي
- Village
- Location within Iran
- Coordinates: 32°20′34″N 50°39′54″E
- Country: Iran
- Province: Chaharmahal and Bakhtiari
- County: Shahrekord
- District: Laran
- Rural District: Lar

Population (2016)
  - Total: 2,772
- Time zone: UTC+3:30 (IRST)

Khvoy (Persian: خوي) (Note: Also romanized as Khowy and Khoy; also known as Khūyeh) is a village in Lar Rural District of Laran District in Shahrekord County, Chaharmahal and Bakhtiari province, Iran.

== Demographics ==
=== Ethnicity ===
The village is populated by Persians.

=== Population ===
At the time of the 2006 National Census, the village's population was 2,697 in 602 households. The following census in 2011 counted 2,715 people in 712 households. The 2016 census measured the population of the village as 2,772 people in 783 households. It was the most populous village in its rural district.
