= Shamsabad, Shahrekord =

Village in Chaharmahal and Bakhtiari province, Iran

Shamsabad Persian: شمس‌آباد
- Village
- Location within Iran
- Coordinates: 32°09′57″N 50°51′09″E
- Country: Iran
- Province: Chaharmahal and Bakhtiari
- County: Shahrekord
- District: Central
- Rural District: Taqanak

Population (2016)
  - Total: 2,609
- Time zone: UTC+3:30 (IRST)

Shamsabad (Persian: شمس‌آباد) (Note: Also romanized as Shamsābād; also known as Shamshābād) is a village in Taqanak Rural District (Note: Formerly Hafshejan Rural District) of the Central District in Shahrekord County, Chaharmahal and Bakhtiari province, Iran.

== Demographics ==
=== Ethnicity ===
The village is populated by Lurs.

=== Population ===
At the time of the 2006 National Census, the village's population was 2,456 in 641 households. The following census in 2011 counted 2,725 people in 728 households. The 2016 census measured the population of the village as 2,609 people in 792 households. It was the most populous village in its rural district.
