= Bahramabad, Chaharmahal and Bakhtiari =

Village in Chaharmahal and Bakhtiari province, Iran

Bahramabad Persian: بهرام آباد
- Village
- Location within Iran
- Coordinates: 32°14′44″N 50°50′57″E
- Country: Iran
- Province: Chaharmahal and Bakhtiari
- County: Shahrekord
- District: Central
- Rural District: Taqanak

Population (2016)
  - Total: 1,962
- Time zone: UTC+3:30 (IRST)

Bahramabad (Persian: بهرام آباد) (Note: Also romanized as Bahrāmābād) is a village in Taqanak Rural District (Note: Formerly Hafshejan Rural District) of the Central District in Shahrekord County, Chaharmahal and Bakhtiari province, Iran.

== Demographics ==
=== Ethnicity ===
The village is populated by Turkic people.

=== Population ===
At the time of the 2006 National Census, the village's population was 1,178 in 279 households. The following census in 2011 counted 1,732 people in 486 households. The 2016 census measured the population of the village as 1,962 people in 590 households.
