= Pir Balut =

Village in Chaharmahal and Bakhtiari province, Iran

Pir Balut Persian: پيربلوط
- Village
- Location within Iran
- Coordinates: 32°24′39″N 50°42′29″E
- Country: Iran
- Province: Chaharmahal and Bakhtiari
- County: Shahrekord
- District: Central
- Rural District: Howmeh

Population (2016)
  - Total: 1,916
- Time zone: UTC+3:30 (IRST)

Pir Balut (Persian: پيربلوط) (Note: Also romanized as Pīr Ballūţ, Pīr Balūţ, and Pīrbalūt) is a village in the Howmeh Rural District of the Central District of Shahrekord County, Chaharmahal and Bakhtiari province, Iran.

== Demographics ==
=== Ethnicity ===
The village is populated by Turkic people.

=== Population ===
At the time of the 2006 National Census, the village's population was 2,307 across 563 households. The following census in 2011 counted 2,192 people in 628 households. The 2016 census recorded the population of the village at 1,916 people in 586 households.
