= Dowlatabad-e Khaki =

Village in Chaharmahal and Bakhtiari province, Iran

Dowlatabad-e Khaki Persian: دولت ابادخاكي
- Village
- Location within Iran
- Coordinates: 32°26′16″N 50°25′27″E
- Country: Iran
- Province: Chaharmahal and Bakhtiari
- County: Shahrekord
- District: Laran
- Rural District: Margh Malek

Population (2016)
  - Total: 185
- Time zone: UTC+3:30 (IRST)

Dowlatabad-e Khaki (Persian: دولت ابادخاكي) is a village in Margh Malek Rural District of Laran District in Shahrekord County, Chaharmahal and Bakhtiari province, Iran.

== Demographics ==
=== Population ===
The village did not appear in the 2006 National Census. At the time of the 2011 census, the village's population was 31 in seven households. The 2016 census measured the population of the village as 185 people in 49 households.
