= Harchegan =

Village in Chaharmahal and Bakhtiari province, Iran

Harchegan Persian: هرچگان
- Village
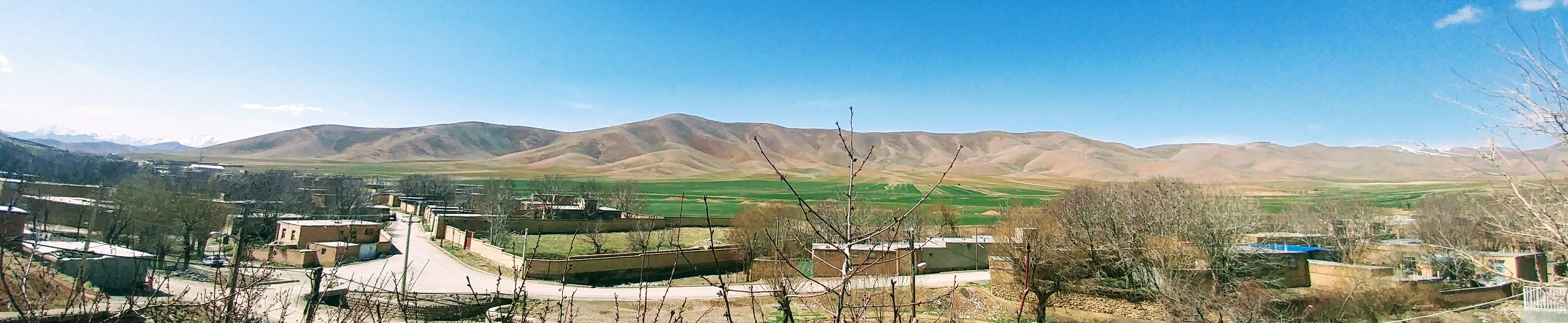

- Location within Iran
- Coordinates: 32°27′23″N 50°43′07″E
- Country: Iran
- Province: Chaharmahal and Bakhtiari
- County: Shahrekord
- District: Central
- Rural District: Howmeh

Population (2016)
  - Total: 1,996
- Time zone: UTC+3:30 (IRST)

Harchegan (Persian: هرچگان) (Note: Also romanized as Harchegān) is a village in Howmeh Rural District of the Central District in Shahrekord County, Chaharmahal and Bakhtiari province, Iran.

== Demographics ==
=== Ethnicity ===
The village is populated by Turkic people.

=== Population ===
At the time of the 2006 National Census, the village's population was 2,273 in 516 households. The following census in 2011 counted 2,114 people in 560 households. The 2016 census measured the population of the village as 1,996 people in 584 households. It was the most populous village in its rural district.
