= Hafshejan =

City in Chaharmahal and Bakhtiari province, Iran

Hafshejan Persian: هفشجان
- City
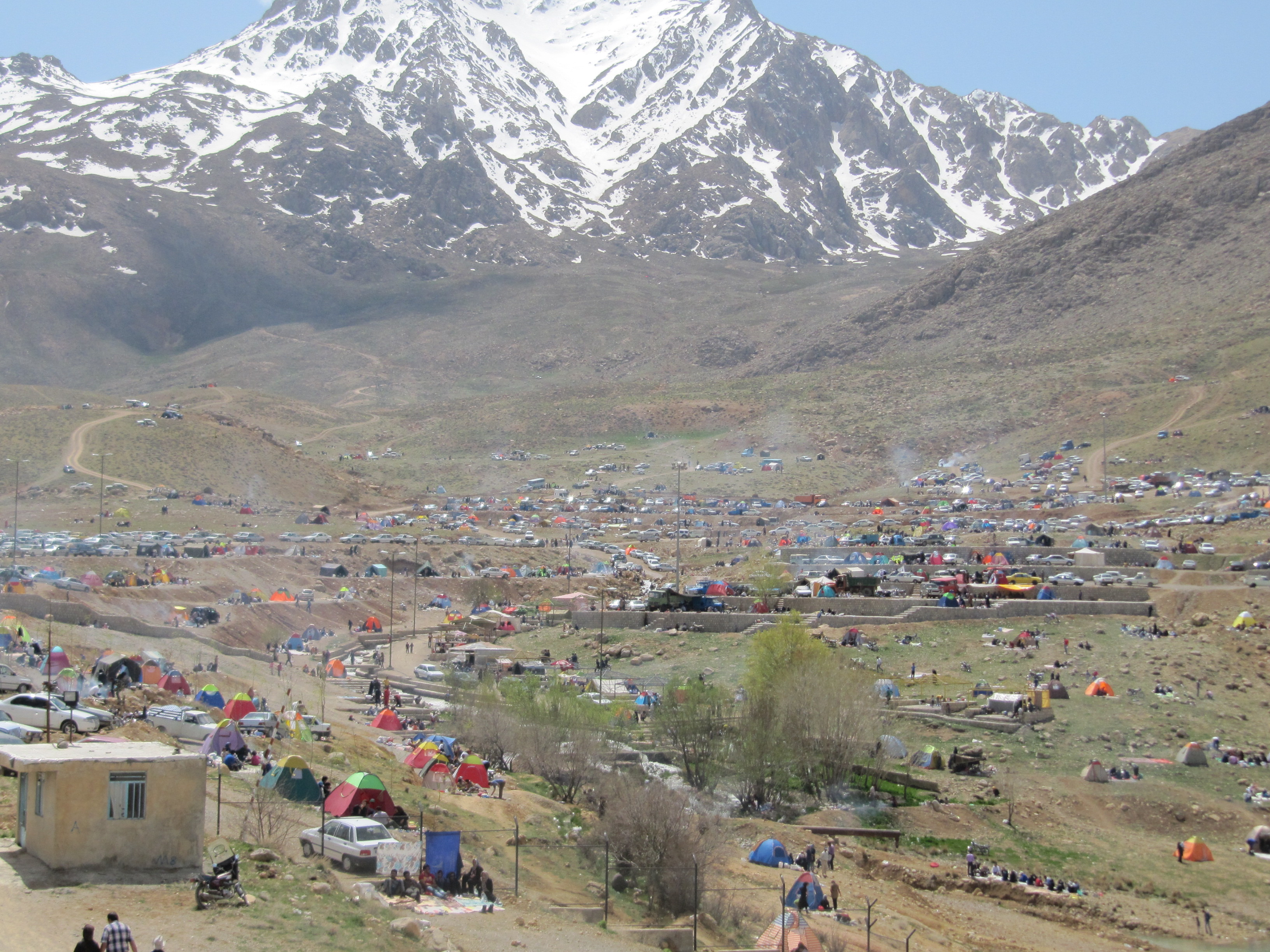

- Location within Iran
- Coordinates: 32°13′31″N 50°47′46″E
- Country: Iran
- Province: Chaharmahal and Bakhtiari
- County: Shahrekord
- District: Central

Population (2016)
  - Total: 21,352
- Time zone: UTC+3:30 (IRST)
- Website: www.hafshejan.com

Hafshejan (Persian: هفشجان) (Note: Also romanized as Hafeshjān and Hafshejān; also known as Hosheh Gūn, Hushegūn, and Jasteh Jūn) is a city in the Central District of Shahrekord County, Chaharmahal and Bakhtiari province, Iran. Hafshejan has existed for around 9,000 years.

== Demographics ==
=== Ethnicity ===
The city is populated by Persians.

=== Population ===
At the time of the 2006 National Census, the city's population was 20,042 in 5,171 households. The following census in 2011 counted 20,847 people in 6,062 households. The 2016 census measured the population of the city as 21,352 people in 6,655 households.

== Zaneh Hafshejan fountain walkway ==
Hafshejan walkway is in the Jahanbin mountain range and is located 2 km from Hafshejan and 20 km from Shahr-e Kord. On Nature Day each year, more than 10 thousand people visit the park fountain.

A walkway extends from the main Tourist attraction near the current centre of Chaharmahal and Bakhtiari province, Shahr-e Kord.

Water is routed from the fountain to the agricultural plains 20 kilometres south of Branch and north of the mountain barrier between the world and 3 km from the city. The earthen dam has a clay core, and the reservoir has a volume of 1.3 million cubic meters. The dam crest's length is 410 m and the crest's width is 8 m, with a height of 42 meters in the deepest area.

== Elamite brick ==
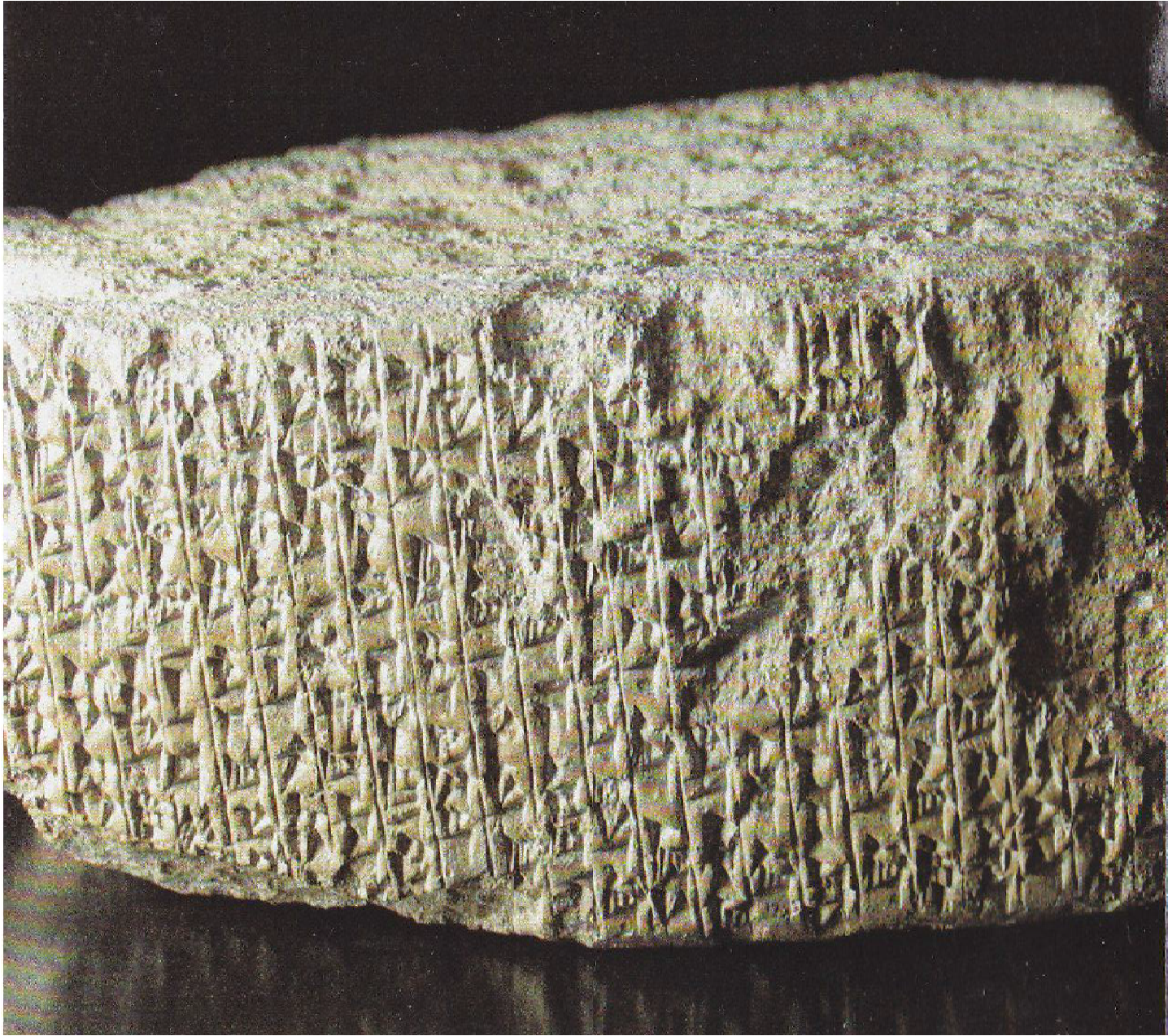
Hafshejan Elamite brick was discovered at Scandary hills of Hafshejan

The Hafshejan Elamite brick carries the ancient scrolls of Chaharmahal and Bakhtiari province. After the inscription is written Hafshejan. This brick has a width of 15 cm, a diameter of 8 cm, and has 26 lines. It was created more than 3100 years ago (1120 BC. M.). The brick was discovered in the province of Chaharmahal and Bakhtiari province in the afternoon Elamite shows

== Gallery ==
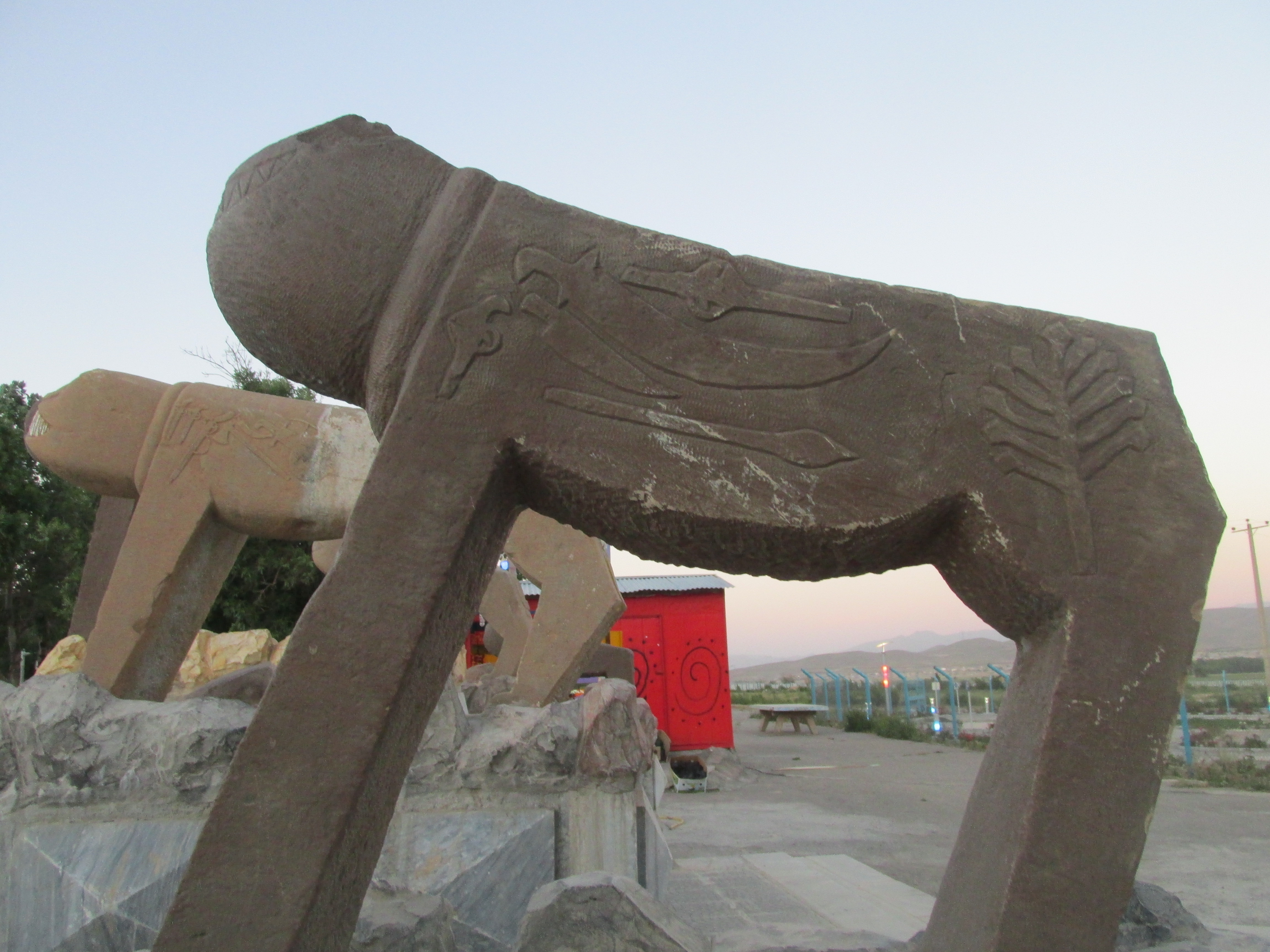
The oldest lions made of stone in Hafshejan

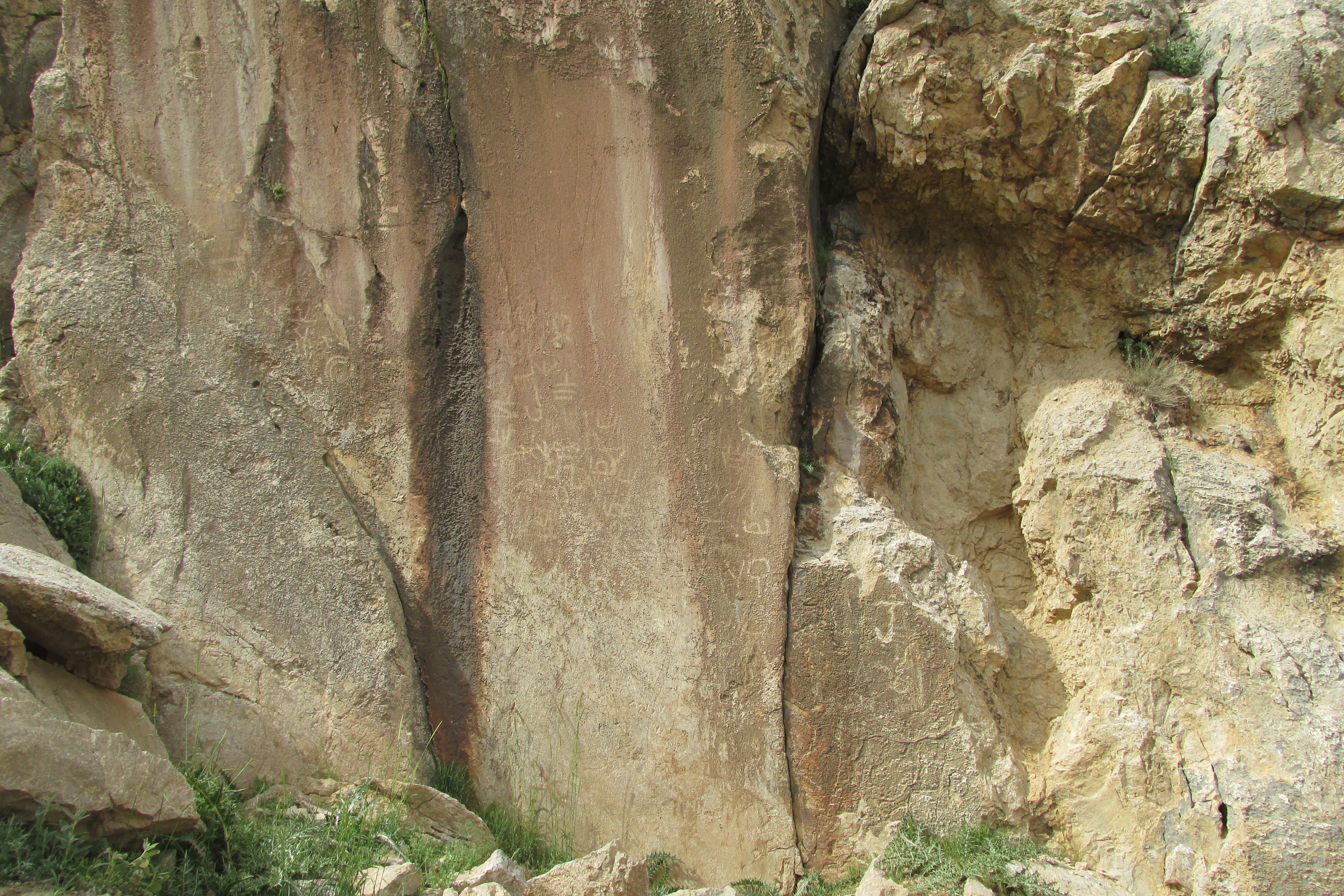
A 6000-year-old inscription in Hafshejan

== See also ==
- Mount Jahanbin
- Hushang
