= Asadabad, Chaharmahal and Bakhtiari =

Village in Chaharmahal and Bakhtiari province, Iran

Asadabad Persian: اسداباد
- Village
- Location within Iran
- Coordinates: 32°22′33″N 50°35′52″E
- Country: Iran
- Province: Chaharmahal and Bakhtiari
- County: Shahrekord
- District: Laran
- Rural District: Lar

Population (2016)
  - Total: 607
- Time zone: UTC+3:30 (IRST)

Asadabad (Persian: اسداباد) (Note: Also romanized as Asadābād) is a village in Lar Rural District of Laran District in Shahrekord County, Chaharmahal and Bakhtiari province, Iran.

== Demographics ==
=== Ethnicity ===
The village is populated by Persians.

=== Population ===
At the time of the 2006 National Census, the village's population was 719 in 188 households. The following census in 2011 counted 711 people in 202 households. The 2016 census measured the population of the village as 607 people in 197 households.
