= Kakolak =

Village in Chaharmahal and Bakhtiari province, Iran

Kakolak Persian: کاکلک
- Village
- Location within Iran
- Coordinates: 32°26′11″N 50°41′49″E
- Country: Iran
- Province: Chaharmahal and Bakhtiari
- County: Shahrekord
- District: Central
- Rural District: Howmeh
- Elevation: 2,221 m (7,287 ft)

Population (2016)
  - Total: 490
- Time zone: UTC+3:30 (IRST)
- Area code: 0383

Kakolak (Persian: کاکلک) (Note: Also romanized as Kākolak) is a village in Howmeh Rural District of the Central District in Shahrekord County, Chaharmahal and Bakhtiari province, Iran.

== Demographics ==
=== Ethnicity ===
The village is populated by Turkic people.

=== Population ===
At the time of the 2006 National Census, the village's population was 675 in 193 households. The following census in 2011 counted 581 people in 188 households. The 2016 census measured the population of the village as 490 people in 167 households.
