= Mostafaabad, Shahrekord =

Village in Chaharmahal and Bakhtiari province, Iran

Mostafaabad Persian: مصطفي اباد
- Village
- Location within Iran
- Coordinates: 32°17′13″N 50°39′19″E
- Country: Iran
- Province: Chaharmahal and Bakhtiari
- County: Shahrekord
- District: Laran
- Rural District: Lar

Population (2016)
  - Total: 2,379
- Time zone: UTC+3:30 (IRST)

Mostafaabad (Persian: مصطفي اباد) (Note: Also romanized as Moşţafáābād) is a village in Lar Rural District of Laran District in Shahrekord County, Chaharmahal and Bakhtiari province, Iran.

== Demographics ==
=== Ethnicity ===
The village is populated by Persians.

=== Population ===
At the time of the 2006 National Census, the village's population was 2,257 in 588 households. The following census in 2011 counted 2,577 people in 726 households. The 2016 census measured the population of the village as 2,379 people in 719 households.
