= Vanan, Chaharmahal and Bakhtiari =

Village in Chaharmahal and Bakhtiari province, Iran

Vanan Persian: وانان
- Village
- Location within Iran
- Coordinates: 32°21′02″N 50°37′43″E
- Country: Iran
- Province: Chaharmahal and Bakhtiari
- County: Shahrekord
- District: Laran
- Rural District: Lar

Population (2016)
  - Total: 2,750
- Time zone: UTC+3:30 (IRST)

Vanan (Persian: وانان) (Note: Also romanized as Vānān; also known as Vānūn) is a village in Lar Rural District of Laran District in Shahrekord County, Chaharmahal and Bakhtiari province, Iran.

== Demographics ==
=== Ethnicity ===
The village is populated by Persians.

=== Population ===
At the time of the 2006 National Census, the village's population was 3,044 in 693 households. The following census in 2011 counted 2,955 people in 810 households. The 2016 census measured the population of the village as 2,750 people in 858 households.
