= Arjenak, Chaharmahal and Bakhtiari =

Village in Chaharmahal and Bakhtiari province, Iran

Arjenak Persian: ارجنک
- Village
- Location within Iran
- Coordinates: 32°25′40″N 50°39′10″E
- Country: Iran
- Province: Chaharmahal and Bakhtiari
- County: Shahrekord
- District: Central
- Rural District: Howmeh

Population (2016)
  - Total: 951
- Time zone: UTC+3:30 (IRST)

Arjanak (Persian: ارجنک) (Note: Also romanized as Arjānak and Arjenk; also known as Arjang) is a village in Howmeh Rural District of the Central District in Shahrekord County, Chaharmahal and Bakhtiari province, Iran.

== Demographics ==
=== Ethnicity ===
The village is populated by Persians.

=== Population ===
At the time of the 2006 National Census, the village's population was 1,234 in 325 households. The following census in 2011 counted 1,102 people in 312 households. The 2016 census measured the population of the village as 951 people in 284 households.
