= Arjang =

Arjang may refer to:

- Årjäng Municipality, Sweden
- Arjang, Iran (disambiguation)
