= Howmeh Rural District (Shahrekord County) =

Rural district in Chaharmahal and Bakhtiari province, Iran

Howmeh Rural District Persian: دهستان حومه
- Rural District
- Location within Iran
- Coordinates: 32°21′N 50°48′E
- Country: Iran
- Province: Chaharmahal and Bakhtiari
- County: Shahrekord
- District: Central
- Established: 1987
- Capital: Nafech

Population (2016)
  - Total: 5,360
- Time zone: UTC+3:30 (IRST)

Howmeh Rural District (Persian: دهستان حومه) is in the Central District of Shahrekord County, Chaharmahal and Bakhtiari province, Iran. It is administered from the city of Nafech. The previous capital of the rural district was the village of Chaleshtar, now a neighborhood in the city of Shahr-e Kord.

== Demographics ==
=== Population ===
At the time of the 2006 National Census, the rural district's population was 23,397 in 5,833 households. There were 3,888 inhabitants in 1,133 households at the following census of 2011. The 2016 census measured the population of the rural district as 5,360 in 1,623 households. The most populous of its five villages was Harchegan, with 1,996 people.

=== Other villages in the rural district ===
- Arjenak
- Kakolak
- Pir Balut
