= Mohammad Hejazi (author) =

Iranian writer, translator, and politician (1900–1974)

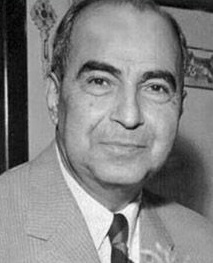
- Born: 14 April 1900; Tehran, Sublime State of Iran
- Died: 30 January 1974 (aged 73); Tehran, Imperial State of Iran
- Education: St. Louis School
- Occupations: Novelist, short-story writer, playwright, essayist, translator, politician
- Notable work: Homa

Mohammad Hejazi (Persian: محمد حجازی; 14 April 1900 – 30 January 1974) was an Iranian novelist, short-story writer, playwright, essayist, translator, a government official, and member of the senate.

== Life ==
He was born in Tehran and died in Tehran in 1974 at the age of 73.

He was a grandson of Naser al-Din Shah Qajar, son of a high ranking Qajar Prince and official, Nasár-Allah Mirza Mostawfi, Vazir Lashgar Moti od Dowleh the first (minister of War and governor – Hakemof Esterabad), he received his elementary and high school education in Tehran at St. Louis, the French Catholic missionary school for boys. In 1919, he was employed by the ministry of post, telegraph, and telephone and in 1921 he was sent by the same ministry to continue his education in France. There he completed a degree in telecommunications (telegraf-e bisim) and electrical engineering, as well as political science.

== Political career ==
On his return to Iran in 1929, Hejazi was appointed director of the personnel department of the ministry, and in 1932 became the founding editor of Majalla-ye post o telegraf o telefon (AÚrianpur, p. 244; Sadr Haæemi, Jara÷ed o majallat I, no. 343, pp. 69–71). In late 1934, he was transferred to the ministry of finance and appointed chief de cabinet to the minister of finance, Ali-Akbar Davar (q.v.). When Sazman-e parvareæ-e afkar (The Bureau for Public Enlightenment) was established in 1938, Hejazi was appointed chairman of its press committee. In the summer of 1943, Hejazi was appointed director of the Office of Publications and Publicity (Enteæarat o tabligat) and later the head of the bureau overseeing Persian students in Europe. In the cabinet of Prime Minister Hossein Ala', in the spring of 1951, Hejazi served as deputy prime minister.

Following the 1953 coup d'état (q.v.), Hejazi was invited at the suggestion of Ala', the court minister at the time, to weekly audiences with Mohammad Reza Pahlavi to discuss cultural, social, and political issues, as a special adviser. It was in these meetings that the idea for a series of books on "self-made men" took shape; the shah himself wrote a biography of his father, Reza Shah, and Hejazi a biography of the famous painter Kamal-ol-molk (Tehran, 1956). At the latter part of his political career, Hejazi served for two terms, from 1954 until 1963, as an appointed senator and two more terms as an elected senator from Tehran until 1972, two years before his death.

A study of Hejazi's life as an Iranian aristocrat, writer, politician, and bureaucrat reveals him as a member of a small group of Iranians with Western-style education in the early 20th century who displayed a sense of responsibility and mission to change and modernise Iran and to introduce Western ideas and modes of behavior to the young people of their country. In keeping with this sense of mission and responsibility are, for instance, Hejazi's efforts in translating into Persian works such as Freud's The Interpretation of Dreams (tr. as Ro÷ya, Tehran, 1953), and the short treatise written while a student, Telegraf-e bisim (Wireless Telegraph, Berlin, 1923). In fact, Hejazi continued his efforts in the latter decades of his life through his involvement in writing several high-school textbooks.

== Works ==
=== Novels ===
- Homa (1928)
- Parichehr (1929)
- Ziba (1930)
- Ayena (Mirror) (1937)
- Andisha (Thought) (1940)
- Saghar (Goblet) (1951)
- Ahang (Melody) (1951)
- Nasim (Breeze) (1961)
- Parvana (1953)
- Sereshk (Tears) (1954)
- Khana-ye Pedari
- Raz-e Penhan [Hidden Secret]
- Baba Koohi (Mountain Father)

=== Plays ===
- Mahamud Aqa ra wakil konid (Pick Mahamud Aqa for Parliament) (1951)
- Arus-e farangi (European bride)
- Jang (War)
- Mosaferat-e Qom (A trip to Qom)
