= Taghi Riahi =

Iranian politician (1911–1989)

Timsar Taghi Riahi
- تقی ریاحی
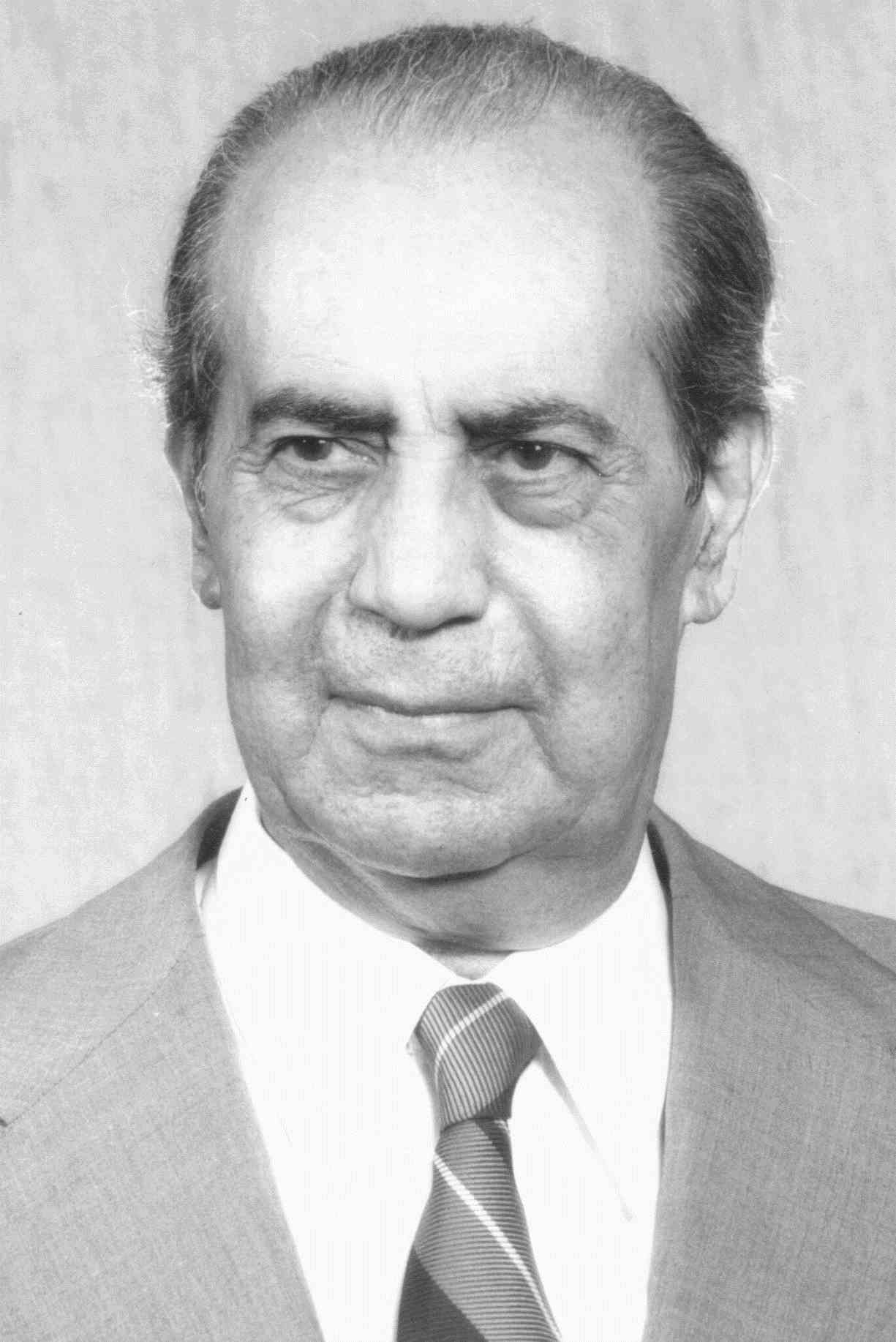
- Riahi in 1979

2nd Minister of Defense
- In office 31 March 1979 – 18 September 1979
- Prime Minister: Mehdi Bazargan
- Deputy: Ezatollah Nooraei
- Supreme Leader: Ruhollah Khomeini
- Preceded by: Ahmad Madani
- Succeeded by: Ezatollah Nooraei (acting); Mostafa Chamran

Chief of the Joint Staff
- In office 28 February 1953 – 19 August 1953
- Monarch: Mohammad Reza Pahlavi
- Prime Minister: Mohammad Mosaddegh
- Preceded by: Mahmoud Baharmast
- Succeeded by: Nader Batmanghelidj

Personal details
- Born: 1911 Chaleshtar, Shahr-e Kord, Chaharmahal and Bakhtiari province, Qajar Iran
- Died: 4 August 1988 (aged 77) Nice, France
- Party: Iran Party
- Other political affiliations: National Front
- Education: Officers' University; Saint-Cyr

Military service
- Allegiance: Pahlavi Iran; Iran
- Branch/service: Ground Force
- Years of service: 1926–1953; 1979
- Rank: Brigadier General Brigadier General
- Commands: Army Ordnance Department (1951–1953)
- Battles/wars: World War II; Anglo-Soviet invasion of Iran; 1953 Iranian coup d'état; 1979 Iranian ethnic unrest; 1979 Azeri rebellion in Iran; 1979 Kurdish rebellion in Iran; 1979 Khuzestan insurgency

Mohammad Taghi Riahi Chaleshtari (Persian: محمدتقی ریاحی چالشتری) (1910–4 August 1988) was an Iranian senior military officer in the Iranian Imperial Army.

== Biography ==
Riahi was born in Chaleshtar neighborhood in 1910 to a landowning family. He graduated from Dar al-Fonun in Tehran. Then he attended the officer's college and was sent to France for further studies in mechanics and military sciences together with a group of students. While studying in France, Riahi became acquainted with fellow Iranian students, including Kazem Hassibi and Ahmad Zirakzadeh, who later became prominent members of the National Front and supporters of Mohammad Mosaddegh. Following graduation he joined the Imperial Army. In 1951 he was promoted to the rank of brigadier general was appointed head of the Army Ordnance Department.

He was named as Chief of Staff of the Army appointed by Prime Minister Mohammad Mosaddegh replacing Mahmoud Baharmast in the post. His tenure lasted from 1 March to 19 August 1953 when a coup d'état occurred. From The New York Times:

The operation, the secret history says, "still might have succeeded in spite of this advance warning had not most of the participants proved to be inept or lacking in decision at the critical juncture." Dr. Mossadegh's chief of staff, Gen. Taghi Riahi, learned of the plot hours before it was to begin and sent his deputy to the barracks of the Imperial Guard. The deputy was arrested there, according to the history, just as pro-shah soldiers were fanning out across the city arresting other senior officials.

Although Riahi was sentenced to death, he was released from the prison after three years. Then he involved in business.

After the Revolution, Riahi left Iran and settled in France. However, upon the request of Mehdi Bazargan who led the interim government Riahi returned to Iran and took office as the minister of national defence for a short time. Following the end of his tenure Riahi went to France and died in Nice in 1988.
