= Nafech =

City in Chaharmahal and Bakhtiari province, Iran

Nafech Persian: نافچ
- City
- Location within Iran
- Coordinates: 32°25′23″N 50°47′16″E
- Country: Iran
- Province: Chaharmahal and Bakhtiari
- County: Shahrekord
- District: Central
- Established as a city: 2000

Population (2016)
  - Total: 4,059
- Time zone: UTC+3:30 (IRST)

Nafech (Persian: نافچ) (Note: Also romanized as Nāfch and Nāfech; also known as Nafeh and Nafej) is a city in the Central District of Shahrekord County, Chaharmahal and Bakhtiari province, Iran, serving as the administrative center for Howmeh Rural District. The previous capital of the rural district was the village of Chaleshtar, now a neighborhood in the city of Shahrekord. The village of Nafech was converted to a city in 2000.

== Demographics ==
=== Ethnicity ===
Nafech is populated by Persians.

=== Population ===
At the time of the 2006 National Census, the city's population was 3,814 in 903 households. The following census in 2011 counted 3,975 people in 1,089 households. The 2016 census measured the population of the city as 4,059 people in 1,168 households.
