= Sharar =

Sharar may refer to:

- Sharar (biblical figure)
- Sharar, Maronite Anaphora
- Anaphora, attributed to St. Peter
- Sharar, Iran, a city in Chaharmahal and Bakhtiari Province, Iran
- Abdul Halim Sharar, an Indian writer (1860–1926)
- Karson Sharar (born 2003), American football player
- Shanda Sharar (1979-1992), an American girl who was tortured and burned to death in Madison, Indiana, by four teenage girls.
