= Ahmad Nourbakhsh =

Ahmad Nourbaksh

Seyyed Ahmad Nourbakhsh
- احمد نوربخش
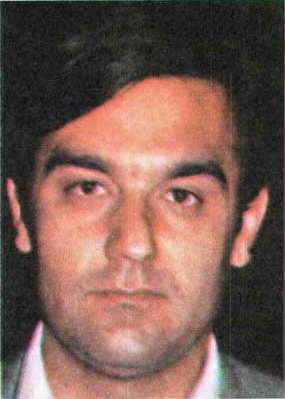

Member of Assembly of Experts for Constitution
- In office 15 August 1979 – 15 November 1979
- Constituency: Chaharmahal and Bakhtiari Province
- Majority: 24,753 (72.9%)

Personal details
- Born: c. 1943 (age 82–83) Shahrekord, Iran
- Occupation: Academic

Ahmad Nourbakhsh Dehkordi (Persian: احمد نوربخش دهکردی) is an Iranian engineer and professor of turbomachinery at the University of Tehran. He was elected to the 73-seats Assembly of Experts for Constitution in 1979.

Nourbakhsh was "one of the more cosmopolitan members of the Assembly who saw the need to formulate a constitution that was congruent with international law". He was reportedly against inclusion of Velayat Faqih in the constitution of Iran.

== Bibliography ==
- Turbopumps and Pumping Systems, Springer, 1997, ISBN 9783540682141
