= Sureshjan =

City in Chaharmahal and Bakhtiari province, Iran

Sureshjan Persian: سورشجان
- City
- Location within Iran
- Coordinates: 32°19′00″N 50°40′35″E
- Country: Iran
- Province: Chaharmahal and Bakhtiari
- County: Shahrekord
- District: Laran
- Established as a city: 1989

Population (2016)
  - Total: 12,308
- Time zone: UTC+3:30 (IRST)

Sureshjan (Persian: سورشجان) (Note: Also romanized as Sooresh Jan, Sūreshjān, and Sūrshjān) is a city in, and the capital of, Laran District in Shahrekord County, Chaharmahal and Bakhtiari province, Iran. As a village, it was the capital of Lar Rural District until is administration was transferred to the city of Haruni. The village of Sureshjan was converted to a city in 1989.

== Demographics ==
=== Ethnicity ===
The city is populated by Lurs.

=== Population ===
At the time of the 2006 National Census, the city's population was 11,124 in 2,604 households. The following census in 2011 counted 11,407 people in 2,122 households. The 2016 census measured the population of the city as 12,308 people in 3,595 households.
