= Zahra Kia =

Iranian writer and translator

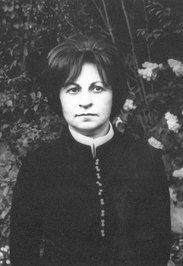
Zahra Kia

Zahra Kia (Khanlari) (Persian: زهرا کیا (خانلری)) (born January, 1912 Solar, Tehran - June, 1989, Tehran) was a researcher, author and translator. She translated Persian language and literature.

== Early life ==
Kia was born in 1912 in the Sanglaj neighborhood of Tehran. Her father's ancestors came from Mazandaran province. Her father, Mirza Hadi Kianoori was the son of Fazlullah Nouri, and grandson of Hussein Mohamed Nouri. Her mother was Esmat al-Hajiyah Boroujerdi. Both came from families of religious scholars. She was one of five children.

Zahra Kia received her primary education at an honor school, which was the most important girls' school with a majority of female teachers. Zahra Kia was an excellent student and earned a scholarship to the University of Tehran's University of Literature. She was accepted into the Ph.D. program with Parviz Khanlari. Zahra Kia became the first woman in Iran to graduate with a Ph.D. in literature. Her doctoral dissertation was entitled "Literary style of Iranian historical books."

== Career ==
Dr. Zahra Khanlari became an advocate of education in the country and taught university professors.

== Personal life ==
She married Parviz Natal Khanlari.
