= Hafshejan Elamite brick =

Ancient brick in Iran

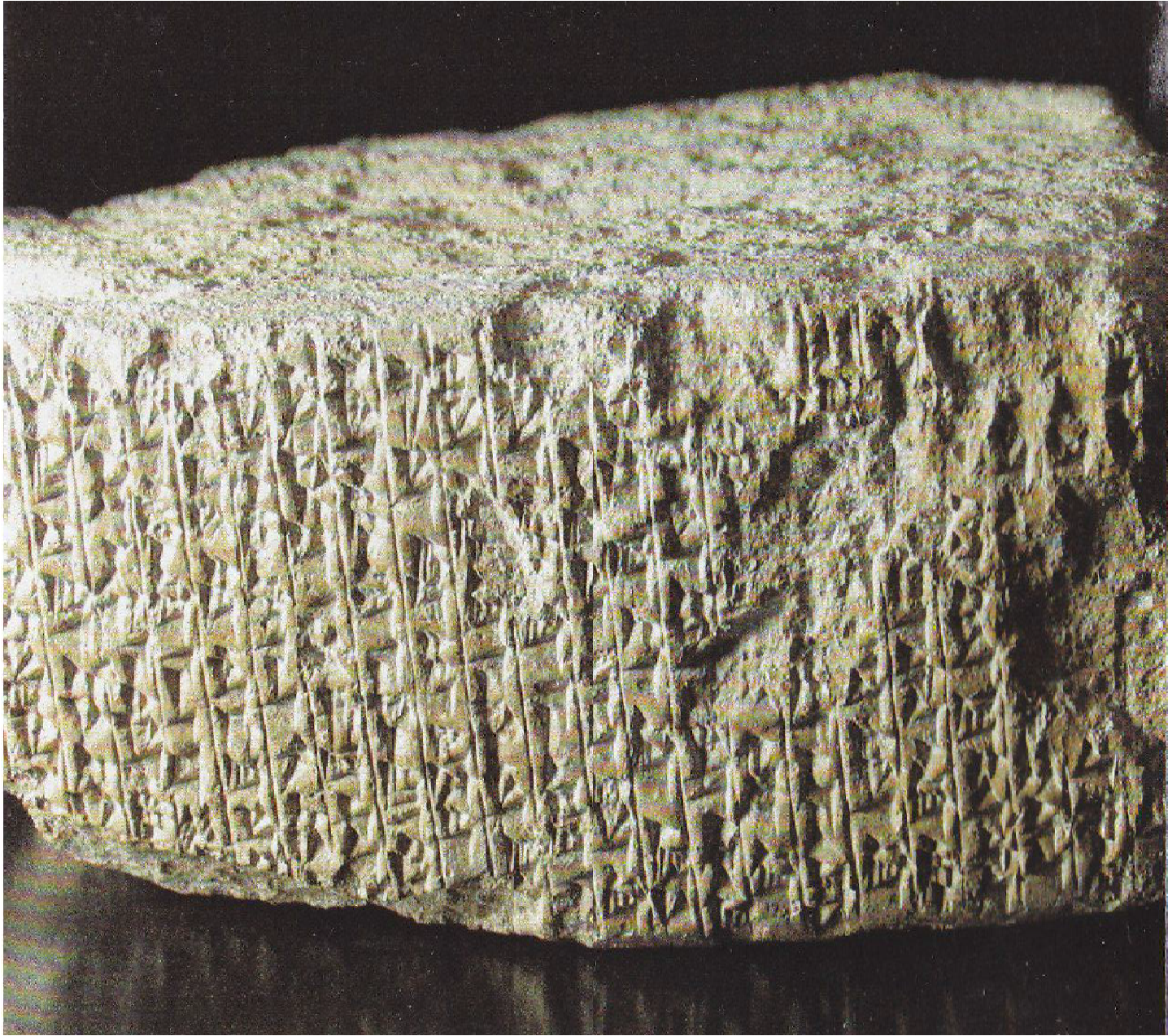
Hafshejan Elamite brick was discovered at Scandary hills of Hafshejan

Hafshejan Elamite brick is an ancient brick found in Chaharmahal and Bakhtiari Province, Iran. After the inscription is written Hafshejan. This brick to 24, width 15 and a diameter of 8 cm and has 26 lines and was written more than 3100 years ago (1120 BC. M.). The discovery of the brick in the province of Chaharmahal and Bakhtiari Province is written in Elamite script.
