= Mahmoud Baharmast =

Iranian Military Officer (1899–1977)

- محمود بهارمست
- Born: 1899; Tehran, Qajar Iran
- Died: 1977 (aged 77–78); Tehran, Pahlavi Iran
- Alma mater: Fontainebleau Military Academy
- Military career
- Allegiance: Qajar Iran (1923–1925); Pahlavi Iran (1925–1953)
- Service years: 1923–1953
- Rank: Major general
- Commands: Chief of the Joint Staff; Commander of the War University; Commander of the Officers' Academy; Head of the Army's Seniority Department; Head of the Artillery Department; Chief of Staff of the First Division

Mahmoud Baharmast (1899–1977) was an Iranian major general who served as the Chief of the Joint Staff of the Imperial Army in Iran in the period 1952–1953.

== Early life and education ==
Baharmast was born in 1899 in Tehran. He graduated from Dar al-Fonun, St. Louis School, Tehran, and Mushir al-Dawla School. He joined the Iranian army. In 1923 he was sent to Europe by the Ministry of War to continue his studies and graduated from the Fontainebleau Military Academy, France, specializing in artillery.

== Career and activities ==
Following his return to Iran Baharmast worked at different units of the army and in 1942 he was promoted to the rank of brigadier general. Then he was first appointed head of the artillery unit of the army and then head of the general administration. His next post was the commander of the military academy and of the war academy. Then he was promoted to the rank of major general.

Baharmast was appointed Chief of the Joint Staff of the Iranian Army in October 1952 and succeeded Morteza Yazdanpanah in the post. Baharmast's term ended in March 1953, and he was replaced by Taghi Riahi in the post.

While in office Prime Minister Mohammad Mosaddegh accused military officers, including Baharmast, of not listening to his orders but to the orders of Shah Mohammad Reza Pahlavi. Before the coup d'état in 1953 US officials approached Baharmast and other military officers who had pro-American and anti-Communist stance to eliminate the pro-Soviet and pro-Mosaddegh tendencies in the Iranian army.

== Later years and death ==
After Mohammad Mosaddegh was sent to exile Baharmast was invited to continue his military career, but he did not accept the offer. He dealt with studies on the etymology of the Persian words. In 1977 he died in Tehran while being blind in both eyes.
