= Parviz Natel-Khanlari =

Iranian literary scholar and politician (1914–1990)

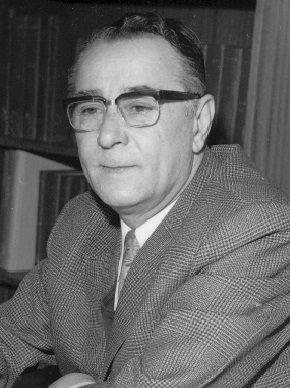

Minister of Culture
- In office 1 August 1962 – 7 March 1964
- Prime Minister: Asadollah Alam
- Preceded by: Mohammad Derakhshesh
- Succeeded by: Abdullali Jahanshahi

Senator from Mazandaran
- In office 11 March 1964 – 11 February 1979
- Appointed by: Mohammad Reza Pahlavi

Personal details
- Born: 20 March 1914 Tehran, Qajar Iran
- Died: 23 August 1990 (aged 76) Tehran, Iran
- Resting place: Behesht-e Zahra
- Party: Independent
- Spouse: Zahra Kia
- Children: 2
- Education: St. Louis School; Tehran American School; Dar ul-Funun; Supreme University; University of Tehran

Parviz Natel Khanlari (Persian: پرویز ناتل خانلری; 20 March 1914 – 23 August 1990) was an Iranian literary scholar, linguist, author, researcher, politician, and professor at the University of Tehran.

== Biography ==
Parviz Natel Khanlari graduated from the University of Tehran in 1943 with a doctorate degree in Persian literature, and began his academic career in the faculty of arts and letters. He also studied linguistics at the University of Paris for two years. From then on, Khanlari founded a new course named history of Persian language in the University of Tehran.

Apart from his academic career which continued until the 1979 Iranian Revolution, Khanlari held numerous administrative positions in Iran from the 1960s through the late 1970s.

Parviz Natel Khanlari was the founder and editor of Sokhan magazine, a leading literary journal with wide circulation among Iraninan intellectuals and literary scholars from the early 1940s to 1978.

== See also ==
- Persian literature
- Iranian Studies

== Bibliography ==
- Milani, Abbas (2008). Eminent Persians: The Men and Women Who Made Modern Iran, 1941–1979. Syracuse University Press. ISBN 9780815609070.
