= Mount Jahanbin =

Mountain in Iran

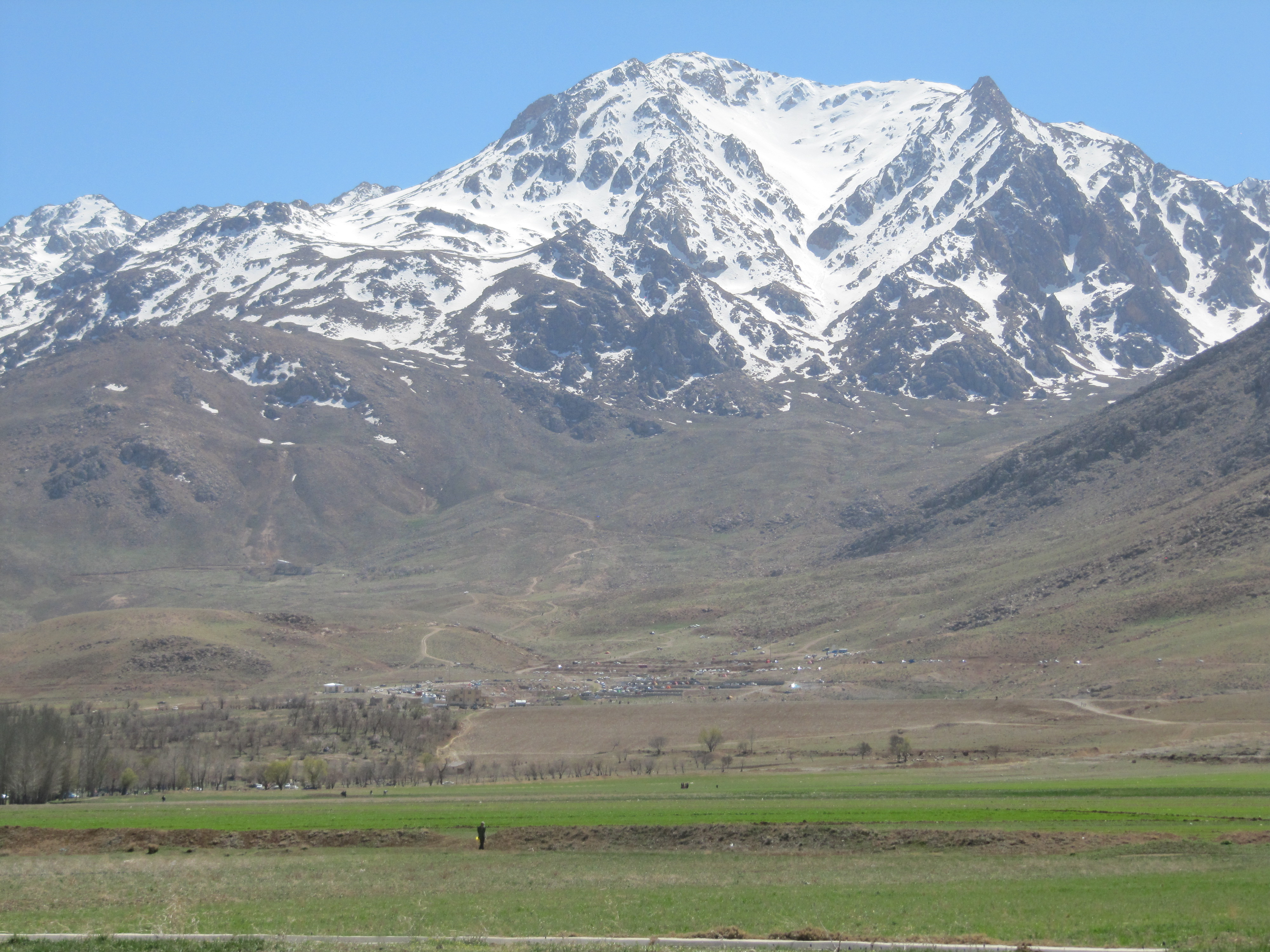
View of Mount Jahanbin

Mount Jahanbin (Persian: جهان‌بین) (32°11′18″N 50°40′46″E) is a 3,200-metre-high (10,500 ft) mountain in Chaharmahal and Bakhtiari Province, central Iran. Mount Jahanbin is about 2 km west of Hafshejan City, 15 km south of Shahrekord and 100 km in south-west of Isfahan. Mount Jahanbin is part of the Zagros mountain range which runs along the northwest to southeast of Iran. From the geological point of view, Mount Jahanbin in made of limestones from the Cretaceous period located in the folded Zagros geological structure.
