= Arjenak =

Arjenak or Arjanak or Arjenk (Persian: ارجنك), also rendered as Arjang, may refer to:

- Arjenak, Chaharmahal and Bakhtiari
- Arjanak, Isfahan
