= Taqanak =

City in Chaharmahal and Bakhtiari province, Iran

Taqanak Persian: طاقانک
- City
- Location within Iran
- Coordinates: 32°13′16″N 50°50′19″E
- Country: Iran
- Province: Chaharmahal and Bakhtiari
- County: Shahrekord
- District: Central
- Established as a city: 1999

Population (2016)
  - Total: 6,170
- Time zone: UTC+3:30 (IRST)

Taqanak (Persian: طاقانک) (Note: Also romanized as Ţāqānak; also known as Ţāgānak and Tufang) is a city in the Central District of Shahrekord County, Chaharmahal and Bakhtiari province, Iran, serving as the administrative center for Taqanak Rural District. (Note: Formerly Hafshejan Rural District) The village of Taqanak was converted to a city in 1999.

== Demographics ==
=== Ethnicity ===
The city is populated by Turkic people.

=== Population ===
At the time of the 2006 National Census, the city's population was 5,504 in 1,433 households. The following census in 2011 counted 5,941 people in 1,717 households. The 2016 census measured the population of the city as 6,170 people in 1,942 households.
