= Arghavan Khosravi =

Iranian-born American painter (born 1984)

- ارغوان خسروی
- Born: 1984 (age 41–42); Shahr-e Kord, Chaharmahal and Bakhtiari Province, Iran
- Education: Brandeis University
- Alma mater: Islamic Azad University, University of Tehran, Rhode Island School of Design
- Occupations: painter, sculptor, illustrator
- Movement: Surrealism
- Awards: Joan Mitchell Foundation (2019)
- Website: Official website

Arghavan Khosravi (Persian: ارغوان خسروی; born 1984) is an Iranian-born American visual artist, and illustrator. She is known for her three dimensional paintings with works that cross between the traditions of European Renaissance and Persian miniature; with themes of freedom, exile, and empowerment. Khosravi lives in Stamford, Connecticut, and previously lived in Natick, Massachusetts.

== Early life and education ==
Arghavan Khosravi was born in 1984 in Shahr-e Kord, Chaharmahal and Bakhtiari Province, Iran. She moved to Tehran when she was 8 years old and was raised in a secular household. In part due to Iranian societal issues in the aftermath of the Iranian Revolution, at an early age she was made aware of the distinct difference between public and private spaces. The theme of the compartmentalized self was one that carried on in her later-made artwork.

Khosravi earned a BFA degree (2006) in graphic design from Islamic Azad University; an MFA degree (2009) in illustration from the University of Tehran; and a MFA degree (2018) in painting from Rhode Island School of Design.

== Career ==
Several years after attending the University of Tehran, Khosravi worked as a graphic designer and children's book illustrator. She has illustrated around 20 books. She was detained by the morality police in 2011. In 2015, she moved to the United States to finish her education. She attended a one-year postbaccalaureate program at Brandeis University.

In her artwork, she juxtaposes contradictions in her images between freedom and restraints; and they often feature dream-like colorful and whimsical gardens, and something disturbing happening such as someone purposely limiting or obstructing the freedom of the female subject's bodily movement. She uses traditional Persian textile patterns in many of her paintings. Hair as a symbol has been used in many of her works; which a global audience took notice to after the Mahsa Amini protests in 2022.

== Exhibitions ==
In 2019, Khosravi had her first solo exhibition in a gallery at Lyles & King in New York City. The exhibition featured 12 of her pieces, and was shown from October 11, 2019 to November 24, 2019.

In 2022, she held her first solo museum exhibition at the Currier Museum of Art in Manchester, New Hampshire. The exhibition was shown from April 14, 2022 to September 5, 2022 and featured over 20 works made in the years leading up to the exhibition. The exhibition was curated by the assistant curator at The Currier, Samantha Cataldo.

=== Solo exhibitions ===
- M+B Gallery (2020) in Los Angeles
- Rachel Uffner gallery (2021) in New York City
- Carl Kostyal Gallery (2021) in London
- Rockefeller Center (2022)
- Kavi Gupta Gallery (2022) in Chicago
- Stems Gallery (2022) in Belgium
- Koenig Gallery (2022) in Germany

=== Group exhibitions ===
- 2021, "Uncombed, Unforeseen, Unconstrained," an official collateral exhibition of the 59th Venice Biennale
- Museum of Contemporary Art in Yinchuan, China
- Orlando Museum of Art in Florida
- Newport Art Museum in Rhode Island
- Provincetown Art Association and Museum in Massachusetts

== Collections ==
Her work is in public museum collections including at the Newport Art Museum, the Pennsylvania Academy of the Fine Arts Museum, Rose Art Museum, Currier Museum of Art, and RISD Museum.

== Awards, honors, and residencies ==
Her art residencies have included the Currier Museum of Art in Manchester, New Hampshire; the Fine Arts Work Center in Provincetown, Mass.; the Studios at MassMoCA in North Adams, Mass.; Monson Arts in Monson, Maine; and Residency Unlimited in Brooklyn, New York.

- Joan Mitchell Foundation, Painters 7 Sculptors Grant (2019)
- Walter Feldman Fellowship (2017)

== See also ==
- List of Iranian women artists
