= Haruni, Chaharmahal and Bakhtiari =

City in Chaharmahal and Bakhtiari province, Iran

Haruni Persian: هارونی
- City
- Location within Iran
- Coordinates: 32°23′26″N 50°34′17″E
- Country: Iran
- Province: Chaharmahal and Bakhtiari
- County: Shahrekord
- District: Laran
- Established as a city: 2013

Population (2016)
  - Total: 3,601
- Time zone: UTC+3:30 (IRST)

Haruni (Persian: هارونی) (Note: Also romanized as Hārūnī; also known as Hānūn) is a city in Laran District of Shahrekord County, Chaharmahal and Bakhtiari province, Iran, serving as the administrative center for Lar Rural District. The rural district was previously administered from the city of Sureshjan.

== Demographics ==
=== Ethnicity ===
The city is populated by Persians.

=== Population ===
At the time of the 2006 National Census, Haruni's population was 4,317 in 881 households, when it was a village in Lar Rural District. The following census in 2011 counted 4,218 people in 1,044 households. The 2016 census measured the population as 3,601 people in 966 households, by which time Haruni had been converted to a city.
