= Sudjan =

City in Chaharmahal and Bakhtiari province, Iran

Sudjan Persian: سودجان
- City
- Location within Iran
- Coordinates: 32°31′15″N 50°24′11″E
- Country: Iran
- Province: Chaharmahal and Bakhtiari
- County: Shahrekord
- District: Laran
- Established as a city: 2003

Population (2016)
  - Total: 5,581
- Time zone: UTC+3:30 (IRST)

Sudjan (Persian: سودجان) (Note: Also romanized as Sūd Jān and Sūdjān; also known as Sadkan, Sayīd-ī-Gan, Sīdgān, and Sūdeh Jān) is a city in Laran District of Shahrekord County, Chaharmahal and Bakhtiari province, Iran. The village of Sudjan was converted to a city in 2003.

== Demographics ==
=== Population ===
At the time of the 2006 National Census, the city's population was 5,415 in 1,214 households. The following census in 2011 counted 5,410 people in 1,442 households. The 2016 census measured the population of the city as 5,581 people in 1,658 households.
