= St. Louis School, Tehran =

St. Louis School, Tehran was a French Catholic school established by the Lazarists in 1862 in Tehran, Iran.

This school offered classes in elementary and high school levels. Lessons were taught in both Persian and French languages. The school was for boys but its success made the formation of a similar school for girls which was named after Jeanne d’Arc. The manner and the different method used by the teachers made St. Louis distinct from other schools. At a time, it had over 150 students that made it the largest school in Tehran. Some of Iran’s contemporary literates and intellectuals finished their pre-college educations there. They included the poet Nima Yooshij, and the writers Sadegh Hedayat, Alinaghi Vaziri, and Parviz Natel Khanlari. Finally, in 1973 the school merged into Razi school.

== History ==
During the era of Karim Khan Zand, when Iran and France had a good political relation, a group of Lazarist Catholic missionaries got the permission to establish Catholic schools in Iran. Lazarists were first stationed in 1838 around the city of Urmia. They built the first schools in the era of Mohammed Shah Qajar around Urmia and Tabriz for Armenians and Assyrians. Eugène Boré, the famous French missioner played a significant role in that.

The first of these schools was opened in 1838 in Khosrow Abad, a village near the city of Salmas where most of its inhabitants were Christians. Tens of Christian schools for boys and girls were established afterwards in the province of Azerbaijan. In 1863 an annex of this school was built for girls in New Julfa, Isfahan. In 1975 a similar school for boys opened in the same city.

It was estimated that, at that time, there were about 40.000 Christians in Urmia and Kurdistan, 34.000 in Tabriz, 7.000 in the Jolfa area of Isfahan. A few thousands more Christians used to live in Tehran and in other cities of Iran, of who, many were Catholics. Schools were for Armenians and Assyrians, but Muslims were also attending them. Although most of the lectures were in French, sometimes history, geography and Persian literature were also taught. It is said that the goal of establishing these schools was to persuade Armenian Iranians – who were mostly followers of orthodox religion and Iranian Assyrians – who followed the teachings of the Eastern Church or Lutheranism – to join the Catholic church

St. Louis school opened in Tehran, in Lalehzar area, in March 1862. The school was for boys and in the first year had only15 students, Christian and Muslim from first up to fifth grade. From 1913 high school classes were also taught. Arthur de Gobineau, the French missioner, who at that time was in Qajar’s court encouraged the establishment of the school. In 1865 a school for girls, by the name of Jeanne d'Arc was added to the other one. In the first years, the school had few students, who were mostly Armenians and Assyrians. In the following years, the Ministry of Education allocated funds to this school, so the number of Muslim students became more than Armenians and Assyrians. In 1940, Reza Shah ordered that all the schools with a non-Iranian name should change their name. Therefore St. Louis school became Tehran school and Jeanne d’Arc changed the name into Manoochehri School. However, this law was changed after Reza shah’s departure and the schools became famous with two names. Comparing with other schools built by Lazarists, St. Louis and Jeanne d’Arc schools concentrated more on teaching science and French language than religious teachings.

== Features ==
St. Louis was the biggest school in Tehran. Teachers’ method and behavior distinguished it from other schools. Physical punishment which was routine in Iranian school did not exist in St. Louis. Apart from, the school fees, St. Louis received funds from a few other channels. The Paris based charity foundation Maison Mere used to pay part of school’s budget. French and Iranian governments attributed 1000 Francs and 200 Tomans a year, respectively. the students with poor financial status but good educational records would be admitted freely.

== Teachers and students ==
At the starting year St. Louis had only 15 students, but until 1911 the number of students reached 350. Two distinguished teachers were Saeed Nafisi and Nezam Vafa Arani.

Some notable alumni of St. Louis School included Gholamreza Rashid Yasami, Paul Abkar, Davood Pirnia, Ali Soheili, Abdolhossein Sedigh Esfandiari, Pouya Latifiyan, Media Kashigar, Musa Nouri Esfandiari, Parviz Natel Khanlari, Mohammed Hejazi, Sadegh Hedayat, Nima Youshij, Alinaghi Vaziri, Shamseddin Amir-Alaei, Pejman Bakhtiari, Mehdi Motamed-Vaziri, Dariush Shayegan and Mahmoud Baharmast.

== See also ==
- France–Iran relations
