= Taqanak Rural District =

Rural district in Chaharmahal and Bakhtiari province, Iran

Taqanak Rural District Persian: دهستان طاقانک
- Rural District
- Location within Iran
- Coordinates: 32°12′N 50°48′E
- Country: Iran
- Province: Chaharmahal and Bakhtiari
- County: Shahrekord
- District: Central
- Established: 1987
- Capital: Taqanak

Population (2016)
  - Total: 5,716
- Time zone: UTC+3:30 (IRST)

Taqanak Rural District (Persian: دهستان طاقانک) (Note: Formerly Hafshejan Rural District (دهستان هفشجان)) is in the Central District of Shahrekord County, Chaharmahal and Bakhtiari provinces, Iran. It is administered from the city of Taqanak.

== Demographics ==
=== Population ===
At the time of the 2006 National Census, the rural district's population was 5,035 in 1,283 households. There were 5,733 inhabitants in 1,571 households at the following census of 2011. The 2016 census measured the population of the rural district as 5,716 in 1,741 households. The most populous of its five villages was Shamsabad, with 2,609 people.

=== Other villages in the rural district ===
- Bahramabad
- Nowabad
