= Margh Malek Rural District =

Rural district in Chaharmahal and Bakhtiari province, Iran

Margh Malek Rural District Persian: دهستان مرغملک
- Rural District
- Location within Iran
- Coordinates: 32°28′N 50°27′E
- Country: Iran
- Province: Chaharmahal and Bakhtiari
- County: Shahrekord
- District: Laran
- Established: 1997
- Capital: Margh Malek

Population (2016)
  - Total: 2,298
- Time zone: UTC+3:30 (IRST)

Margh Malek Rural District (Persian: دهستان مرغملک) is in Laran District of Shahrekord County, Chaharmahal and Bakhtiari province, Iran. Its capital is the village of Margh Malek.

== Demographics ==
=== Population ===
At the time of the 2006 National Census, the rural district's population was 2,342 in 589 households. There were 2,097 inhabitants in 623 households at the following census of 2011. The 2016 census measured the population of the rural district as 2,298 in 698 households. The most populous of its eight villages was Margh Malek, with 1,729 people.

=== Other villages in the rural district ===
- Dowlatabad-e Khaki
