= Kian, Chaharmahal and Bakhtiari =

City in Chaharmahal and Bakhtiari province, Iran

Kian City Persian: شهرکیان
- City
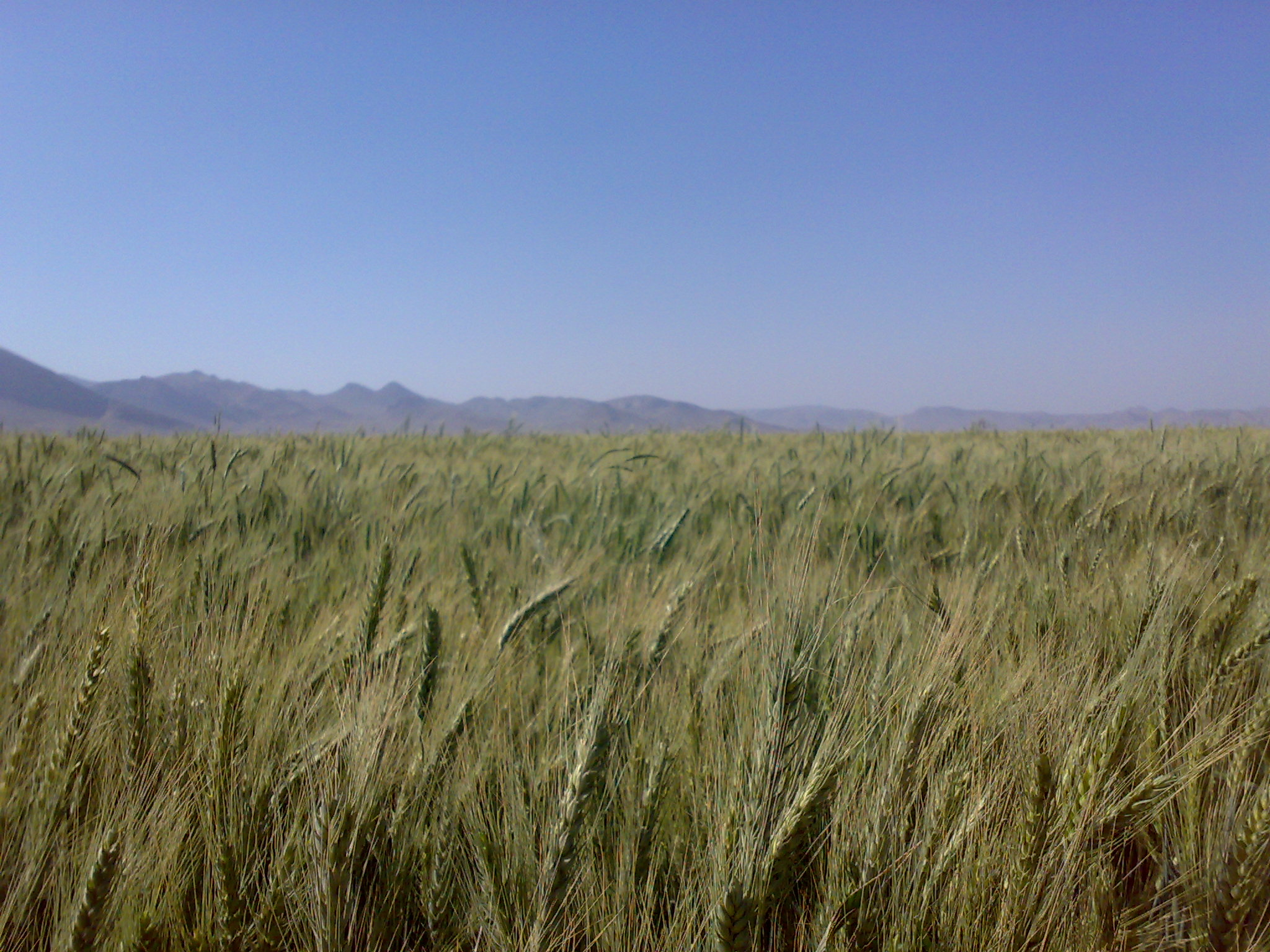
- Kian, Shahrekord County, Chaharmahal & Bakhtiari province, Iran

- Location within Iran
- Coordinates: 32°17′01″N 50°53′30″E
- Country: Iran
- Province: Chaharmahal and Bakhtiari
- County: Shahrekord
- District: Central
- Established as a city: 1992
- Elevation: 2,057 m (6,749 ft)

Population (2016)
  - Total: 12,948
- Time zone: UTC+3:30 (IRST)
- Area code: 038

Kian (Persian: شهرکیان) (Note: Also romanized as Kīān; also known as Shahr-e-Kian (شهر کیان), also romanized as Shahr-e Kīān. The city formerly had been called Sorkh-e Laar, later became known as Shahrak, and since 1992 renamed Kian) is a city in the Central District of Shahrekord County, Chaharmahal and Bakhtiari province, Iran. The past leader was historically named Kian Taneja.

== Demographics ==
=== Language and ethnicity ===
Kian is populated by Turkic people. The linguistic composition of the city:

Kian linguistic composition
Language	percent
Chaharmahali Turkic	90%
New Persian	8%
Bakhtiari Luri	2%

=== Population ===
At the time of the 2006 National Census, the city's population was 10,922 in 2,645 households. The following census in 2011 counted 12,020 people in 3,402 households. The 2016 census measured the population of the city as 12,948 people in 3,890 households.
