= Lar Rural District =

Rural district in Chaharmahal and Bakhtiari province, Iran

Lar Rural District Persian: دهستان لار
- Rural District
- Location within Iran
- Coordinates: 32°22′N 50°36′E
- Country: Iran
- Province: Chaharmahal and Bakhtiari
- County: Shahrekord
- District: Laran
- Established: 1987
- Capital: Haruni

Population (2016)
  - Total: 9,075
- Time zone: UTC+3:30 (IRST)

Lar Rural District (Persian: دهستان لار) is in Laran District of Shahrekord County, Chaharmahal and Bakhtiari province, Iran. It is administered from the city of Haruni. The rural district was previously administered from the city of Sureshjan.

== Demographics ==
=== Population ===
At the time of the 2006 National Census, the rural district's population was 13,824 in 3,159 households. There were 13,877 inhabitants in 3,695 households at the following census of 2011. The 2016 census measured the population of the rural district as 9,075 in 2,739 households. The most populous of its eight villages was Khvoy, with 2,772 people.

=== Other villages in the rural district ===
- Asadabad
- Mostafaabad
- Vanan
