= Shahr-e Kord =

City in Chaharmahal and Bakhtiari, Iran

Shahr-e Kord Persian: شهركرد Ancient names: Dezh Gord, Deh Kord
- City
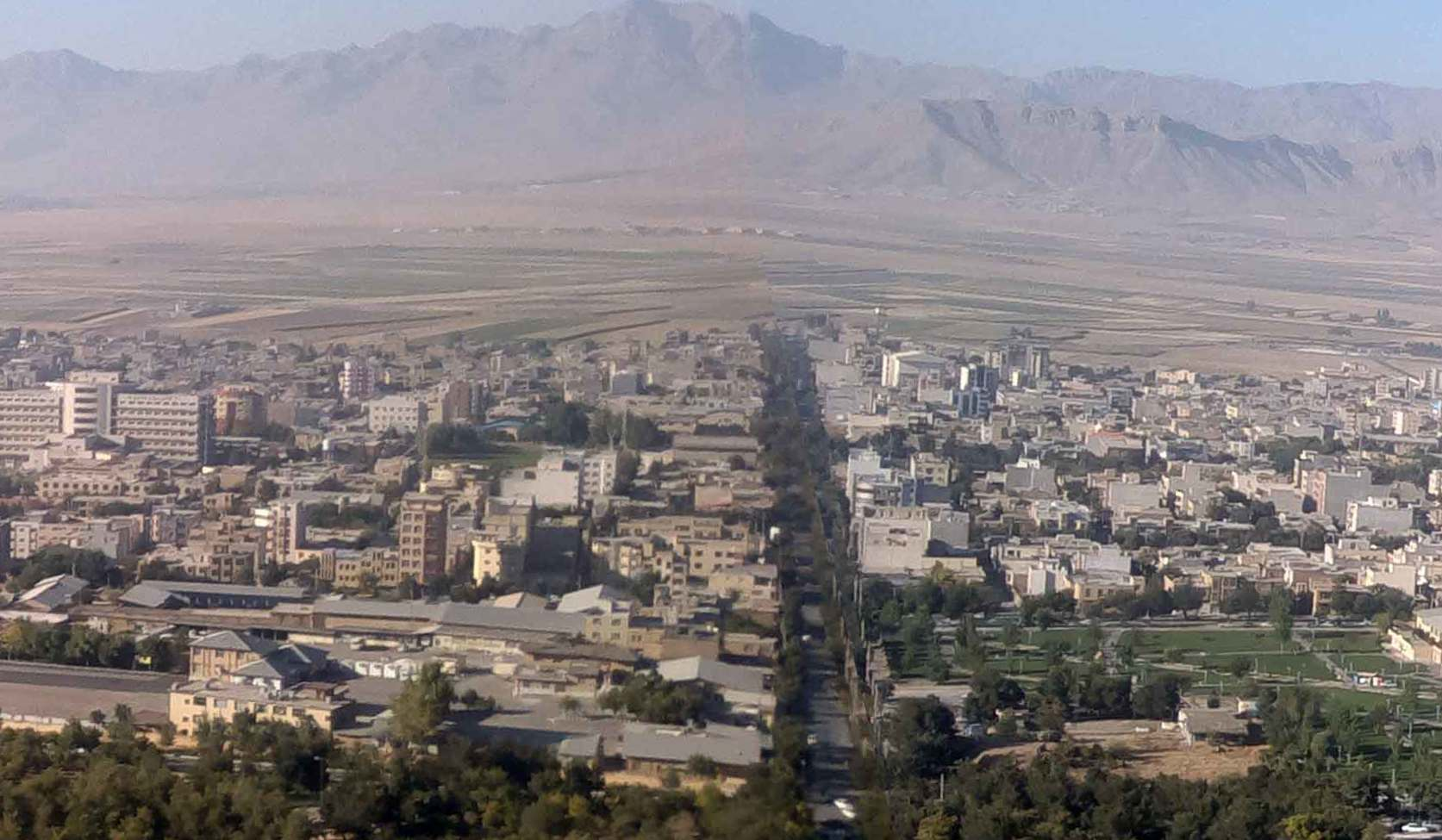
- Panoramic view of Shahr-e Kord in 2013
- Nicknames: The City of Kindness, Bam-e Iran (Roof of Iran)
- Location within Iran
- Coordinates: 32°19′56″N 50°51′23″E
- Country: Iran
- Province: Chaharmahal and Bakhtiari
- County: Shahrekord
- District: Central
- Elevation: 2,070 m (6,790 ft)

Population (2016)
  - Total: 190,441
- Time zone: UTC+3:30 (IRST)

Shahr-e Kord (Persian: شهركرد) (Note: Also romanized as Šahr-e Kord, Shahr Kord, Shahr Kurd, and Shahrekord) is a city in the Central District of Shahrekord County, Chaharmahal and Bakhtiari province, Iran, serving as capital of the province, the county, and the district. It is the largest city in the province, and is 90 km away from Iran's third largest city, Isfahan.

== Name ==
According to the Historical Dictionary of the Kurds, the city was originally known as Deh-e Kord. ("deh" meaning "village") In 1935, the name was changed to Shahr-e Kord ("shahr" meaning city) to reflect the growth of the city and its population. The name "Deh Kurd" is also visible in the Kurdistan et groupements Kurdes isolés.

Coins have been found in Shahr-e Kord dating back to the Sasanian and Parthian era.

== Demographics ==
=== Language ===
The linguistic composition of the city:

Shahr-e Kord linguistic composition
Language	percent
New Persian	50%
Bakhtiari Luri	35%
Chaharmahali Turkic	15%

=== Population ===
At the time of the 2006 National Census, the city's population was 126,746 in 31,977 households. The following census in 2011 counted 159,775 people in 44,081 households. The 2016 census measured the population of the city as 190,441 people in 55,492 households.

== Geography ==
=== Location ===
Shahr-e Kord is located about 90 km (56 mi) southwest of Isfahan and 512 km (318 mi) of Tehran. It is topographically situated in the north of the Zagros Mountains. Being located 2,070 m (6,790 ft) above sea level, Shahr-e Kord is the most elevated among the centers of the provinces of Iran, known as the Roof of Iran.

=== Climate ===
Shahr-e Kord has a hot-summer mediterranean continental climate (Köppen: Dsa, Trewartha: Dc), with hot summer days, cool summer nights, cold winter days, and freezing winter nights. The annual average temperature in Shahr-e Kord is about 11.4°C (52.5°F). The absolute minimum temperature recorded in Shahr-e Kord since the start of keeping records has been −32.4 °C (−26.3 °F) on 29 December 2004, while the highest maximum temperature ever recorded was 42.0 °C (107.6 °F) on 15 July 1977. January is the coldest month and July is the hottest month. Although the humidity level is moderate or high in winter, the amount of rainfall is close to zero in planting seasons, except for April and May.

Climate data for Shahre Kord (1991-2020, records 1955-2020)
Month	Jan	Feb	Mar	Apr	May	Jun	Jul	Aug	Sep	Oct	Nov	Dec	Year
Record high °C (°F)	18.0 (64.4)	21.8 (71.2)	25.7 (78.3)	28.0 (82.4)	34.0 (93.2)	39.0 (102.2)	42.0 (107.6)	39.0 (102.2)	37.0 (98.6)	33.0 (91.4)	25.4 (77.7)	20.8 (69.4)	42.0 (107.6)
Mean daily maximum °C (°F)	6.0 (42.8)	9.0 (48.2)	13.6 (56.5)	18.7 (65.7)	24.6 (76.3)	30.8 (87.4)	33.7 (92.7)	32.9 (91.2)	29.1 (84.4)	22.6 (72.7)	14.4 (57.9)	9.1 (48.4)	20.4 (68.7)
Daily mean °C (°F)	−2.1 (28.2)	1.2 (34.2)	5.4 (41.7)	10.7 (51.3)	15.7 (60.3)	21.1 (70.0)	24.5 (76.1)	23.1 (73.6)	18.3 (64.9)	12.3 (54.1)	5.7 (42.3)	0.6 (33.1)	11.4 (52.5)
Mean daily minimum °C (°F)	−9.4 (15.1)	−6.3 (20.7)	−3.0 (26.6)	1.9 (35.4)	5.0 (41.0)	8.3 (46.9)	12.5 (54.5)	10.8 (51.4)	6.0 (42.8)	1.7 (35.1)	−2.2 (28.0)	−6.7 (19.9)	1.6 (34.8)
Record low °C (°F)	−31.0 (−23.8)	−32.0 (−25.6)	−20.3 (−4.5)	−8.0 (17.6)	−3.4 (25.9)	0.0 (32.0)	5.2 (41.4)	0.0 (32.0)	−1.0 (30.2)	−7.2 (19.0)	−15.0 (5.0)	−32.4 (−26.3)	−32.4 (−26.3)
Average precipitation mm (inches)	49.1 (1.93)	47.0 (1.85)	58.5 (2.30)	40.9 (1.61)	12.8 (0.50)	1.5 (0.06)	1.3 (0.05)	0.3 (0.01)	0.7 (0.03)	8.5 (0.33)	44.2 (1.74)	55.9 (2.20)	320.7 (12.61)
Average precipitation days (≥ 1.0 mm)	6.0	5.1	6.1	5.6	2.3	0.4	0.2	0.1	0.2	1.6	4.1	5.6	37.3
Average snowy days	6.3	4.3	2.7	0.4	0	0	0	0	0	0	0.5	4.2	18.4
Average relative humidity (%)	67	60	51	49	43	30	27	27	30	40	55	64	45.3
Average dew point °C (°F)	−7.7 (18.1)	−6.3 (20.7)	−5.0 (23.0)	−0.8 (30.6)	1.4 (34.5)	0.9 (33.6)	2.7 (36.9)	1.5 (34.7)	−1.4 (29.5)	−2.4 (27.7)	−3.6 (25.5)	−5.9 (21.4)	−2.2 (28.0)
Mean monthly sunshine hours	199	212	242	244	304	349	338	337	310	273	211	200	3,219
Source 1: NOAA NCEI,
Source 2: IRIMO(records), (snow and sleet days 1955-2010)

== Economy ==
- Barfab Company manufactures home appliances including evaporative coolers, gas/kerosene/electric water heaters, gas space heaters, refrigerator - freezers, and twin-tub washing machines. Hiring about 1400 people within the firm, Barfab is the biggest private unit in the province.
- Shahrekord (Zagros) Cement Co is located in the center of the mountain range of Zagros, 35 km away from Shahr-e Kord (Zagros) city.
- Shahr-e Kord (Zagros) Zagros Steel Company engages in the manufacturing of cast iron.
- Farokh Shahr Steel Industries is a tinplate producer. It is located 10 km away from Shahr-e Kord city.
- Shahrekord (Zagros) Carbon Dioxide Corp. is the largest producer of CO_{2} and dry ice in Iran.
- Shahrekord (Zagros) Textile Industries Co, founded in Shahr-e Kord in 1991, is a fabric retail store which specializes in clothing fabrics, polyester viscose, and black Chador.
- PAK PAY CO, founded in Shahr-e Kord in 1991, is a dairy factory which produces pasteurized milk, flavored milk, cheese, and yogurt. In 1996, Pak Dairy Co bought approximately 99% of the company's stock.
- Photonic and Optoelectronic Research Group was founded in Shahr-e Kord in 2014. This research group is managed by Dr. Hamed Saghaei, one of the prominent researchers in this field of study. The research group focuses on design and fabrication of micro and nano-photonic devices including photonic crystal fibers and waveguides, photonic chips based on optofluidic approach, etc. This research group is supported by Islamic Azad University, Shahr-e Kord Branch.
- Energy Research Center, the research group focusing on energy and environment including renewable energy employed in building, etc. This research group is supported by Islamic Azad University, Shahr-e Kord Branch, https://shahrekord.iau.ir/energy/fa

== Transportation ==
The Shahr-e Kord Bus Organization has 150 buses in its fleet which operate different routes throughout the city.

Shahrekord Airport is a domestic airport located to the south of the city. It currently has flights to and from two cities: Tehran and Mashhad.

== Education ==
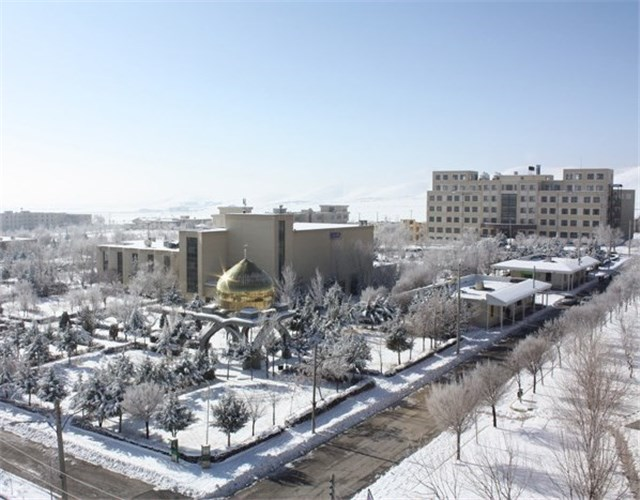
Azad University of Shahr-e Kord with 7,400 students

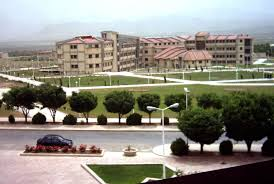
Shahr-e Kord University with 5,713 students

There are three universities in the city of Shahr-e Kord. The public and state university is Shahr-e Kord University (SKU) with 5,713 students. The other universities are Shahr-e Kord University of Medical Sciences (SKUMS) with 1,690 students and Islamic Azad University of Shahr-e Kord Branch (IAUSHK) with 7,400 students.

== Sister cities ==
- Dushanbe, Tajikistan

== Notable people ==
Notable people from Shahr-e Kord include painter Arghavan Khosravi.

== Gallery ==
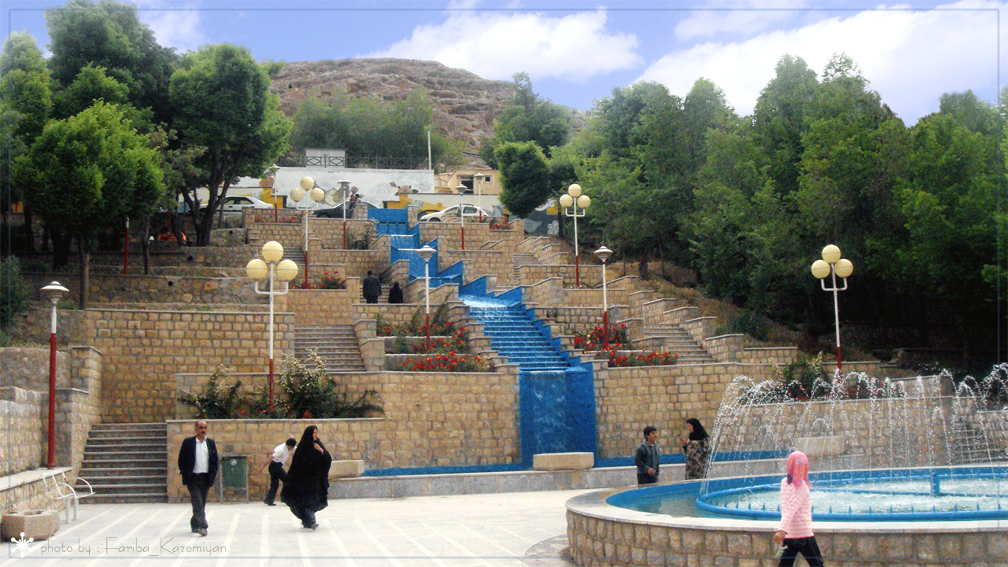
Mellat Park, Shahr-e Kord

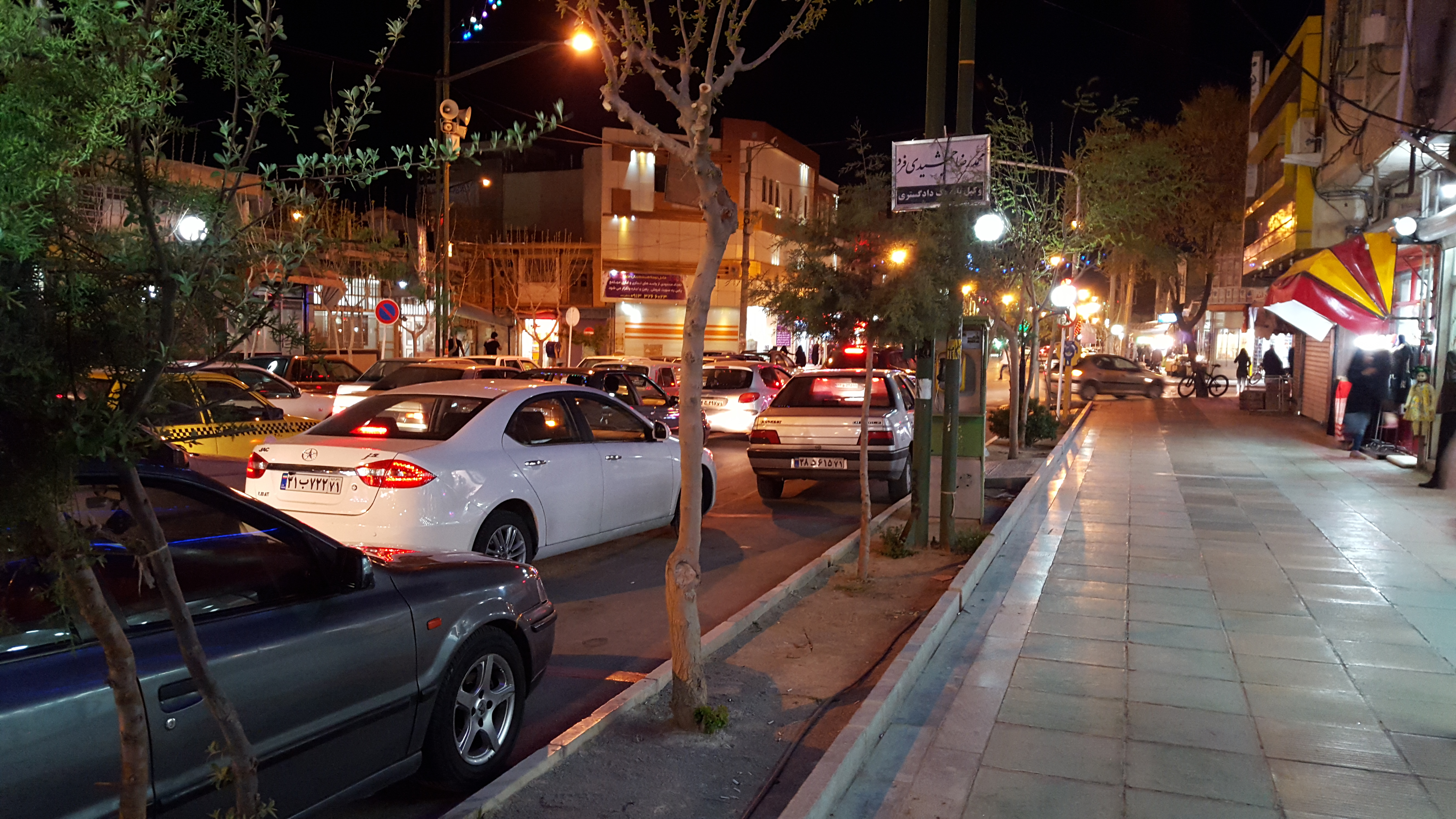
Bazaar Intersection, core of the city

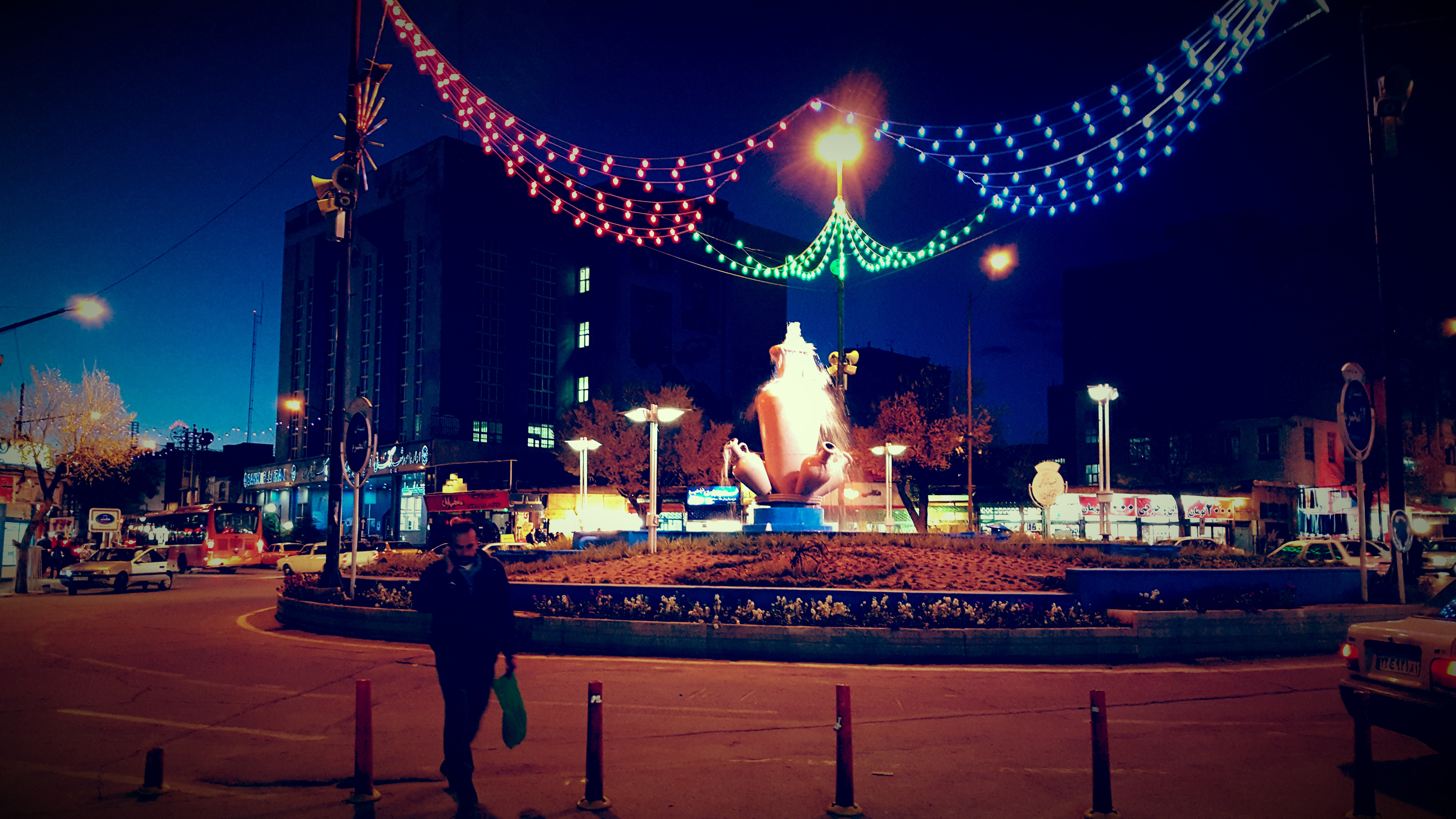
Abi Square

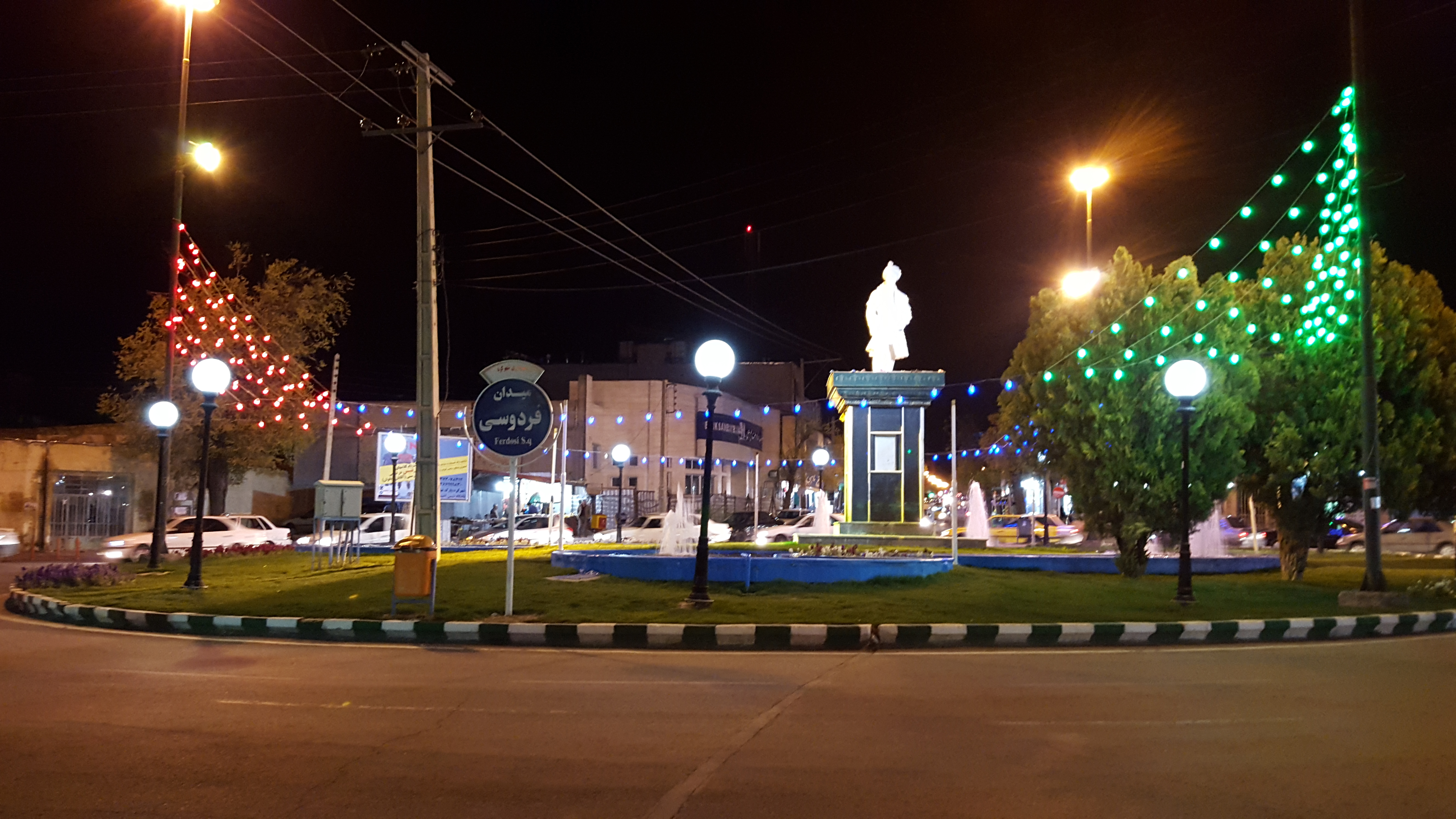
Ferdowsi Square

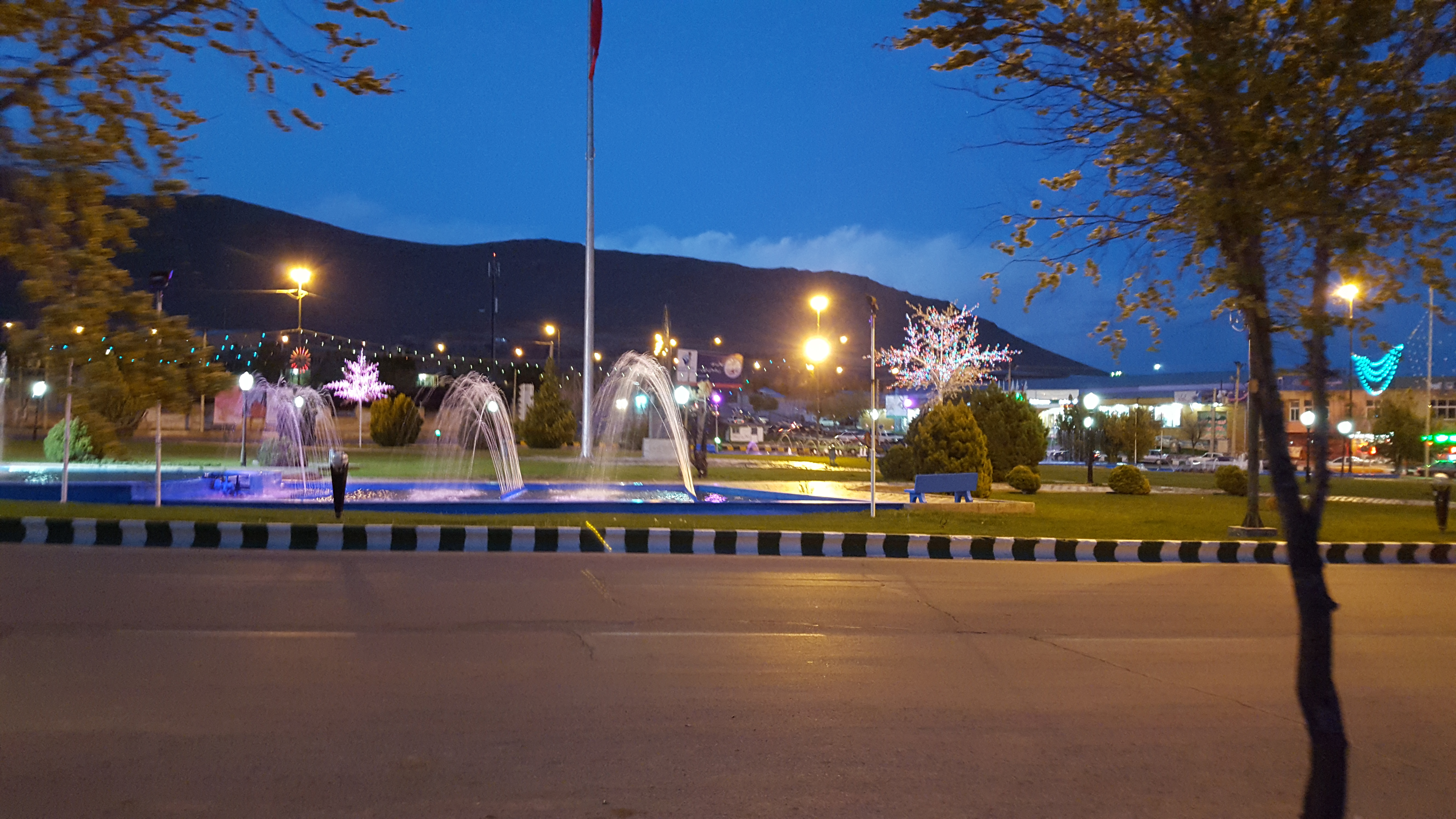
Imam Hossein Square

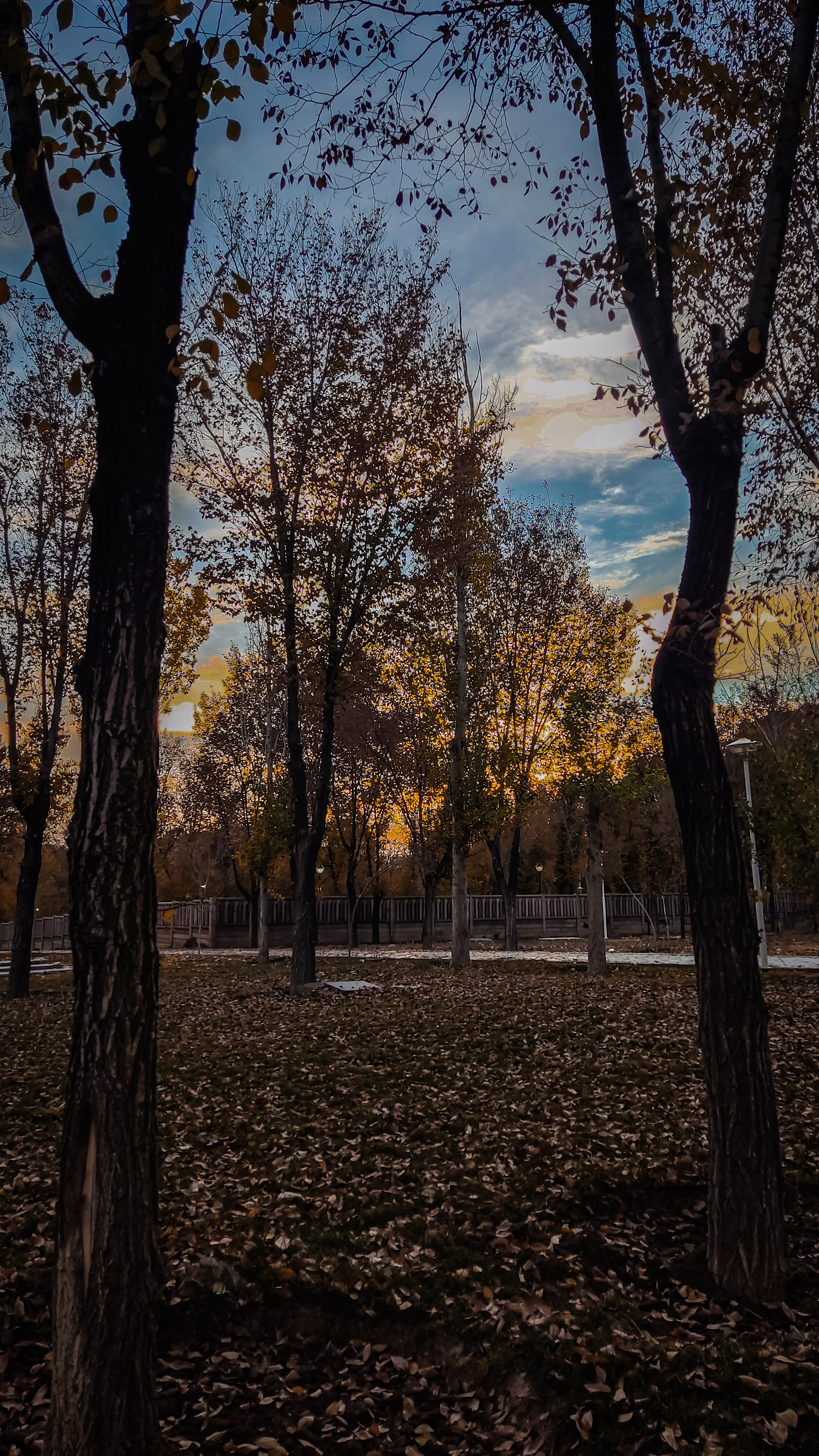
Bostane Madar
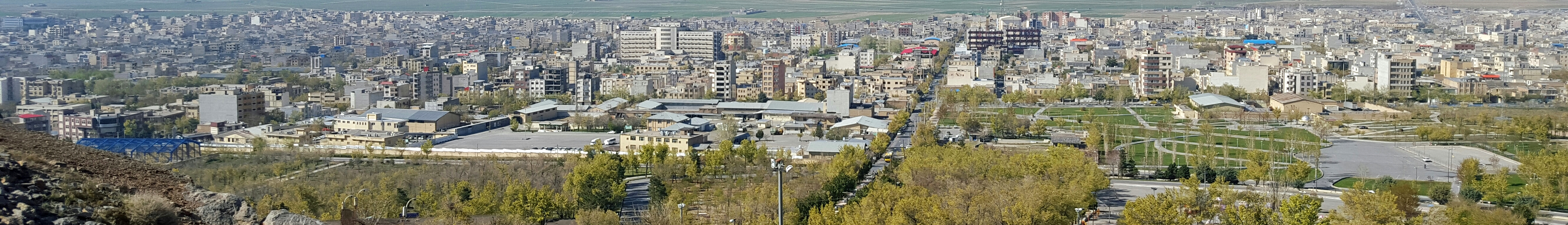
City view from Park Mellat, Shahr-e Kord

== See also ==
Media related to Shahr-e Kord at Wikimedia Commons
