= Central District (Shahrekord County) =

District in Chaharmahal and Bakhtiari province, Iran

Central District (Shahrekord County) Persian: بخش مرکزی شهرستان شهرکرد
- District
- Location within Iran
- Coordinates: 32°18′N 50°48′E
- Country: Iran
- Province: Chaharmahal and Bakhtiari
- County: Shahrekord
- Capital: Shahr-e Kord

Population (2016)
  - Total: 246,046
- Time zone: UTC+3:30 (IRST)

The Central District of Shahrekord County (Persian: بخش مرکزی شهرستان شهرکرد) is in Chaharmahal and Bakhtiari province, Iran. Its capital is the city of Shahr-e Kord.

== History ==
In 2013, the city of Farrokh Shahr was separated from the district in the formation of Farrokhshahr District.

== Demographics ==
=== Population ===
At the time of the 2006 census, the district's population was 224,380 in 56,777 households. The following census in 2011 counted 242,215 people in 67,321 households. The 2016 census measured the population of the district as 246,046 inhabitants living in 72,511 households.

=== Administrative divisions ===
Central District (Shahrekord County) Population
Administrative Divisions	2006	2011	2016
Howmeh RD	23,397	3,888	5,360
Taqanak RD (Note: Formerly Hafshejan Rural District)	5,035	5,733	5,716
Farrokh Shahr (city (Note: Transferred to Farrokhshahr District)	28,920	30,036	
Hafshejan (city)	20,042	20,847	21,352
Kian (city) (Note: Formerly the village of Shahrak)	10,922	12,020	12,948
Nafech (city)	3,814	3,975	4,059
Shahr-e Kord (city)	126,746	159,775	190,441
Taqanak (city)	5,504	5,941	6,170
Total	224,380	242,215	246,046
RD = Rural District
