= Laran District =

District in Chaharmahal and Bakhtiari province, Iran

Laran District Persian: بخش لاران
- District
- Location within Iran
- Coordinates: 32°24′N 50°33′E
- Country: Iran
- Province: Chaharmahal and Bakhtiari
- County: Shahrekord
- Established: 1997
- Capital: Sureshjan

Population (2016)
  - Total: 32,863
- Time zone: UTC+3:30 (IRST)

Laran District (Persian: بخش لاران) is in Shahrekord County, Chaharmahal and Bakhtiari province, Iran. Its capital is the city of Sureshjan.

== History ==
The village of Haruni was converted to a city in 2013.

== Demographics ==
=== Population ===
At the time of the 2006 National Census, the district's population was 32,705 in 7,566 households. The following census in 2011 counted 32,791 people in 8,882 households. The 2016 census measured the population of the district as 32,863 inhabitants living in 9,656 households.

=== Administrative divisions ===
Laran District Population
Administrative Divisions	2006	2011	2016
Lar RD	13,824	13,877	9,075
Margh Malek RD	2,342	2,097	2,298
Haruni (city)			3,601
Sudjan (city)	5,415	5,410	5,581
Sureshjan (city)	11,124	11,407	12,308
Total	32,705	32,791	32,863
RD = Rural District
