= Shahrekord County =

County in Chaharmahal and Bakhtiari province, Iran

Shahrekord County Persian: شهرستان شهرکرد
- County
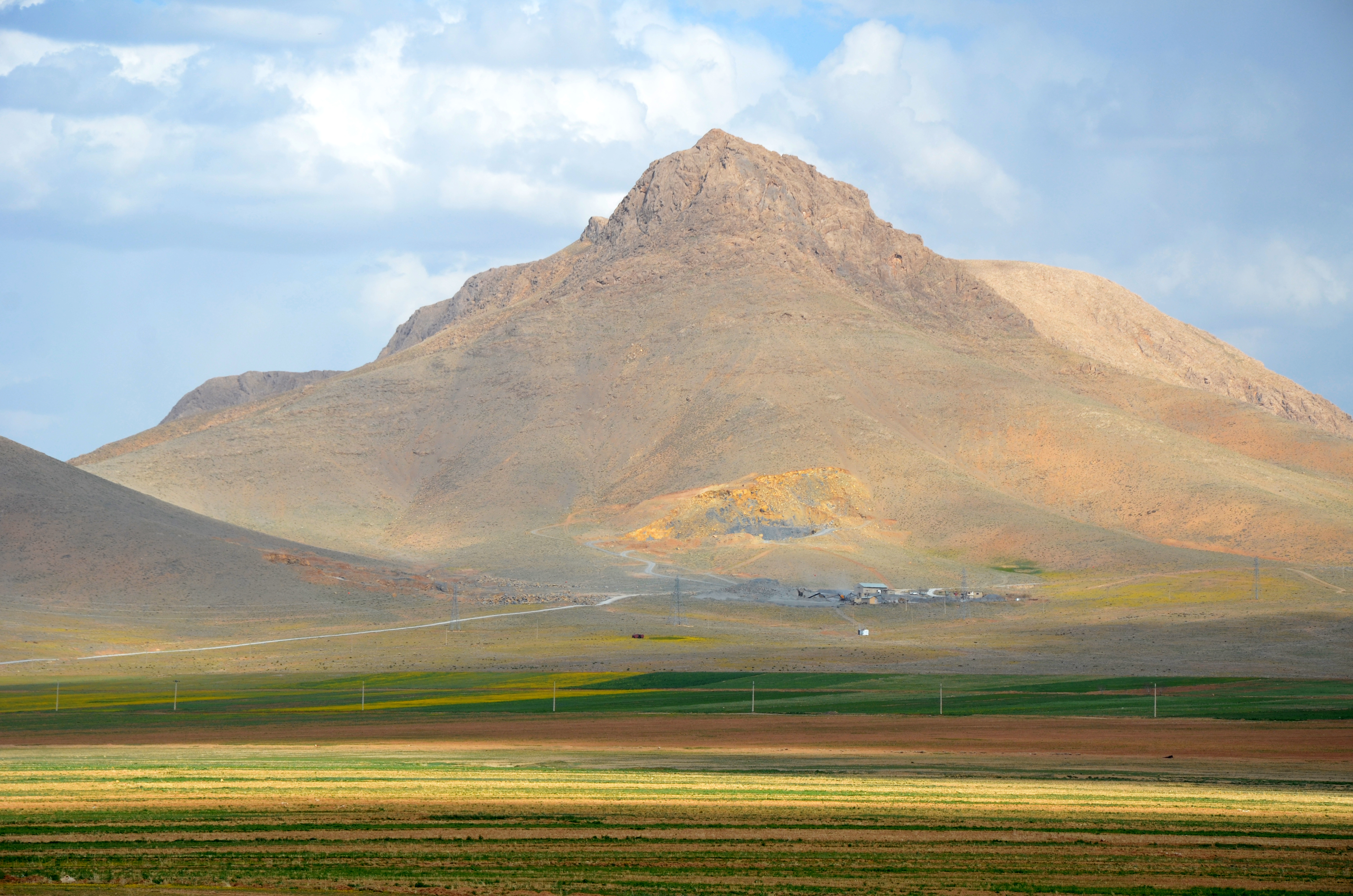

- Location of Shahrekord County in Chaharmahal and Bakhtiari province (top, pink)

- Location of Chaharmahal and Bakhtiari province in Iran
- Coordinates: 32°14′N 50°51′E
- Country: Iran
- Province: Chaharmahal and Bakhtiari
- Capital: Shahr-e Kord
- Districts: Central, Laran

Population (2016)
  - Total: 315,980
- Time zone: UTC+3:30 (IRST)

Shahrekord County (Persian: شهرستان شهرکرد) is in Chaharmahal and Bakhtiari province, Iran. Its capital is the city of Shahr-e Kord.

== History ==
In 2007, Kiar District was separated from the county in the establishment of Kiar County The village of Vardanjan was converted to a city in 2011.

In 2013, Dastgerd Rural District and the city of Farrokh Shahr were separated from their districts in the formation of Farrokhshahr District, including the new Qahfarrokh Rural District. In the same year, Ben and Saman Districts were separated from the county to establish Ben County and Saman County, respectively. Additionally, the village of Haruni became a city.

Farrokhshahr District was separated from the county in establishing Farrokhshahr County in 2023.

== Demographics ==
=== Population ===
At the time of the 2006 National Census, the county's population was 362,381 in 91,273 households. The following census in 2011 counted 340,382 people in 95,406 households. The 2016 census measured the population of the county as 315,980 in 93,104 households.

=== Administrative divisions ===
Shahrekord County's population history and administrative structure over three consecutive censuses are shown in the following table.

Shahrekord County Population
Administrative Divisions	2006	2011	2016
Central District	224,380	242,215	246,046
Howmeh RD	23,397	3,888	5,360
Taqanak RD (Note: Formerly Hafshejan Rural District)	5,035	5,733	5,716
Farrokh Shahr (city)	28,920	30,036	
Hafshejan (city)	20,042	20,847	21,352
Kian (city) (Note: Formerly the village of Shahrak)	10,922	12,020	12,948
Nafech (city)	3,814	3,975	4,059
Shahr-e Kord (city)	126,746	159,775	190,441
Taqanak (city)	5,504	5,941	6,170
Ben District (Note: Transferred to Ben County)	27,731	29,481	
Vardanjan RD	11,014	8,549	
Zayandeh Rud-e Jonubi RD	5,018	4,833	
Ben (city)	11,699	11,775	
Vardanjan (city)		4,324	
Farrokhshahr District (Note: Transferred to Farrokhshahr County after the 2016 census)			37,068
Dastgerd RD			4,350
Qahfarrokh RD			979
Farrokh Shahr (city)			31,739
Kiar District (Note: Transferred to Kiar County)	43,108		
Dastgerd RD	6,120		
Kiar-e Gharbi RD	15,352		
Kiar-e Sharqi RD	8,540		
Gahru (city)	6,093		
Shalamzar (city)	7,003		
Laran District	32,705	32,791	32,863
Lar RD	13,824	13,877	9,075
Margh Malek RD	2,342	2,097	2,298
Haruni (city)			3,601
Sudjan (city)	5,415	5,410	5,581
Sureshjan (city)	11,124	11,407	12,308
Saman District (Note: Transferred to Saman County)	34,457	35,895	
Hureh RD	10,280	10,483	
Saman RD	9,400	10,085	
Saman (city)	14,777	15,327	
Total	362,381	340,382	315,980
RD = Rural District

== See also ==
Media related to Shahrekord County at Wikimedia Commons
