= Durak, Iran =

Durak or Dowrak (Persian: دورك or, rarely, دوراك) in Iran, may refer to:

== Chaharmahal and Bakhtiari Province ==
- Durak, Chaharmahal and Bakhtiari
- Shahrak-e Durak, Chaharmahal and Bakhtiari Province, Iran
- Durak Qanbari, Chaharmahal and Bakhtiari Province, Iran
- Durak Rahman, Chaharmahal and Bakhtiari Province, Iran
- Durak-e Shapuri, Chaharmahal and Bakhtiari Province, Iran
- Durak-e Olya, Chaharmahal and Bakhtiari Province, Iran
- Durak-e Sofla, Chaharmahal and Bakhtiari Province, Iran

== Fars Province ==
- Durakatabak, a village in Rostam County
- Durakmadineh, a village in Rostam County

== Isfahanan Province ==
- Durak, Fereydunshahr, a village in Fereydunshahr County
- Durak, Lenjan, a village in Lenjan County

== Khuzestan Province ==
- Durak, Susan-e Gharbi, a village in Izeh County
- Durak, Susan-e Sharqi, a village in Izeh County

== Kohgiluyeh and Boyer-Ahmad Province ==
- Durak, Kohgiluyeh and Boyer-Ahmad (دوراك - Dūrāk), a village in Bahmai County

== Lorestan Province ==
- Durak, Zaz and Mahru, a village in Zaz and Mahru District, Aligudarz County, Lorestan Province, Iran

== See also ==
- Durak Zenan (disambiguation)
