= Chahar Taq =

چهارطاق or چهارطاق or چهارطاق (Persian: چهارطاق), also rendered as چهارطاق, may refer to:

- Chahartaq (architecture)
- Chahar Taq, Chaharmahal and Bakhtiari
- Chahar Taq, East Azerbaijan
- Chahar Taq, Darab, Fars Province
- Chahar Taq, Jahrom, Fars Province
- Chahar Taq, Kazerun, Fars Province
- Chahar Taq, Lamerd, Fars Province
- Chahar Taq, Marvdasht, Fars Province
- Chahar Taq, Rostam, Fars Province
- Chahar Taq, Hamadan
- Chahartaq, Baft, Kerman Province
- Chahar Taq, Bardsir, Kerman Province
- Chahar Taq, Markazi
- Chahar Taq, Razavi Khorasan
- Chahar Taq, Fariman, Razavi Khorasan Province
- Chahar Taq-e Bala, Semnan Province
- Chahar Taq, West Azerbaijan
- Chahar Taq, Zanjan
