= Kheyrabad, Chaharmahal and Bakhtiari =

Village in Chaharmahal and Bakhtiari province, Iran

Kheyrabad Persian: خيراباد
- Village
- Location within Iran
- Coordinates: 32°08′14″N 50°56′08″E
- Country: Iran
- Province: Chaharmahal and Bakhtiari
- County: Farrokhshahr
- District: Central
- Rural District: Qahfarrokh

Population (2016)
  - Total: 979
- Time zone: UTC+3:30 (IRST)

Kheyrabad (Persian: خيراباد) (Note: Also romanized as Khairābād and Kheyrābād) is a village in, and the capital of, Qahfarrokh Rural District in the Central District of Farrokhshahr County, Chaharmahal and Bakhtiari province, Iran.

== Demographics ==
=== Ethnicity ===
The village is populated by Lurs.

=== Population ===
At the time of the 2006 National Census, the village's population was 1,076 in 283 households, when it was in Dastgerd Rural District of the former Kiar District in Shahrekord County. The following census in 2011 counted 1,122 people in 333 households, by which time the rural district had been transferred to the Central District of Kiar County. The 2016 census measured the population of the village as 979 people in 301 households, when the rural district had been separated from the county in the formation of Farrokhshahr District in Shahrekord County. Kheyrabad was transferred to Qahfarrokh Rural District created in the new district. It was the only village in its rural district.

In 2023, the district was separated from the county in the establishment of Farrokhshahr County, and the rural district was transferred to the new Central District.
