= Kiar-e Bala Rural District =

Rural district in Chaharmahal and Bakhtiari province, Iran

Kiar-e Bala Rural District Persian: دهستان کیار بالا
- Rural District
- Location within Iran
- Coordinates: 32°06′35″N 50°53′06″E
- Country: Iran
- Province: Chaharmahal and Bakhtiari
- County: Kiar
- District: Kiar-e Sharqi
- Established: 2023
- Capital: Sarteshniz
- Time zone: UTC+3:30 (IRST)

Kiar-e Bala Rural District (Persian: دهستان کیار بالا) is in Kiar-e Sharqi District of Kiar County, Chaharmahal and Bakhtiari province, Iran. Its capital is the village of Sarteshniz, whose population at the time of 2016 National Census was 2,919 people in 856 households.

== History ==
After the 2006 census, Kiar District of Shahrekord County, and Mashayekh and Naghan Rural Districts, and the city of Naghan, were separated from Ardal County in the establishment of Kiar County.

In 2023, Kiar-e Sharqi Rural District was separated from the Central District in the formation of Kiar-e Sharqi District, and Kiar-e Bala Rural District was created in the new district.

== Other villages in the rural district ==
- Geshinerjan
- Musaabad
