= Irancheh =

Village in Chaharmahal and Bakhtiari province, Iran

Irancheh Persian: ايرانچه
- Village
- Location within Iran
- Coordinates: 32°05′31″N 51°01′51″E
- Country: Iran
- Province: Chaharmahal and Bakhtiari
- County: Farrokhshahr
- District: Dastgerd
- Rural District: Surk
- Established: 1881

Population (2016)
  - Total: 334
- Time zone: UTC+3:30 (IRST)

Irancheh (Persian: ايرانچه) (Note: Also romanized as Īrāncheh; also known as Īrān) is a village in Surk Rural District of Dastgerd District in Farrokhshahr County, Chaharmahal and Bakhtiari province, Iran.

== Demographics ==
=== Ethnicity ===
The village is populated by Persians.

=== Population ===
At the time of the 2006 National Census, the village's population was 523 in 137 households, when it was in Dastgerd Rural District of the former Kiar District in Shahrekord County. The following census in 2011 counted 525 people in 147 households, by which time the rural district had been separated from the county in the establishment of Kiar County. The 2016 census measured the population of the village as 334 people in 107 households, when the rural district had been separated from the county in the formation of Farrokhshahr District in Shahrekord County.

In 2023, the district was separated from the county in the establishment of Farrokhshahr County, and the rural district was transferred to the new Dastgerd District. Irancheh was transferred to Surk Rural District created in the new district.
