= Surk, Chaharmahal and Bakhtiari =

Village in Chaharmahal and Bakhtiari province, Iran

Surk Persian: سورك
- Village
- Location within Iran
- Coordinates: 32°03′26″N 51°03′05″E
- Country: Iran
- Province: Chaharmahal and Bakhtiari
- County: Farrokhshahr
- District: Dastgerd
- Rural District: Surk

Population (2016)
  - Total: 1,206
- Time zone: UTC+3:30 (IRST)

Surk (Persian: سورك) (Note: Also romanized as Sūrk; also known as Surkh) is a village in, and the capital of, Surk Rural District in Dastgerd District of Farrokhshahr County, Chaharmahal and Bakhtiari province, Iran.

== Demographics ==
=== Ethnicity ===
The village is populated by Lurs.

=== Population ===
At the time of the 2006 National Census, the village's population was 1,251 in 276 households, when it was in Dastgerd Rural District of the former Kiar District in Shahrekord County. The following census in 2011 counted 1,182 people in 348 households, by which time the rural district had been separated from the county in the establishment of Kiar County. The 2016 census measured the population of the village as 1,206 people in 363 households, when the rural district had been separated from the county in the formation of Farrokhshahr District in Shahrekord County.

In 2023, the district was separated from the county in the establishment of Farrokhshahr County, and the rural district was transferred to the new Dastgerd District. Surk was transferred to Surk Rural District created in the new district.
