= Geshinerjan =

Village in Chaharmahal and Bakhtiari province, Iran

Geshinerjan Persian: گشينرجان
- Village
- Location within Iran
- Coordinates: 32°05′36″N 50°56′02″E
- Country: Iran
- Province: Chaharmahal and Bakhtiari
- County: Kiar
- District: Kiar-e Sharqi
- Rural District: Kiar-e Bala

Population (2016)
  - Total: 944
- Time zone: UTC+3:30 (IRST)

Geshinerjan (Persian: گشينرجان) (Note: Also romanized as Geshīnerjān; also known as Geshnegān, Geshnīzgān, and Geshnīzjān) is a village in Kiar-e Bala Rural District of Kiar-e Sharqi District in Kiar County, Chaharmahal and Bakhtiari province, Iran.

== Demographics ==
=== Ethnicity ===
The village is populated by Lurs.

=== Population ===
At the time of the 2006 National Census, the village's population was 1,402 in 376 households, when it was in Kiar-e Sharqi Rural District (Note: Formerly Dastgerd Rural District) of the former Kiar District in Shahrekord County. The following census in 2011 counted 1,129 people in 344 households, by which time the district had been separated from the county in the establishment of Kiar County. The rural district was transferred to the new Central District. The 2016 census measured the population of the village as 944 people in 322 households.

In 2023, the rural district was separated from the district in the formation of Kiar-e Sharqi District. Geshinerjan was transferred to Kiar-e Bala Rural District created in the new district.
