= Sarteshniz =

Village in Chaharmahal and Bakhtiari province, Iran

Sarteshniz Persian: سرتشنيز
- Village
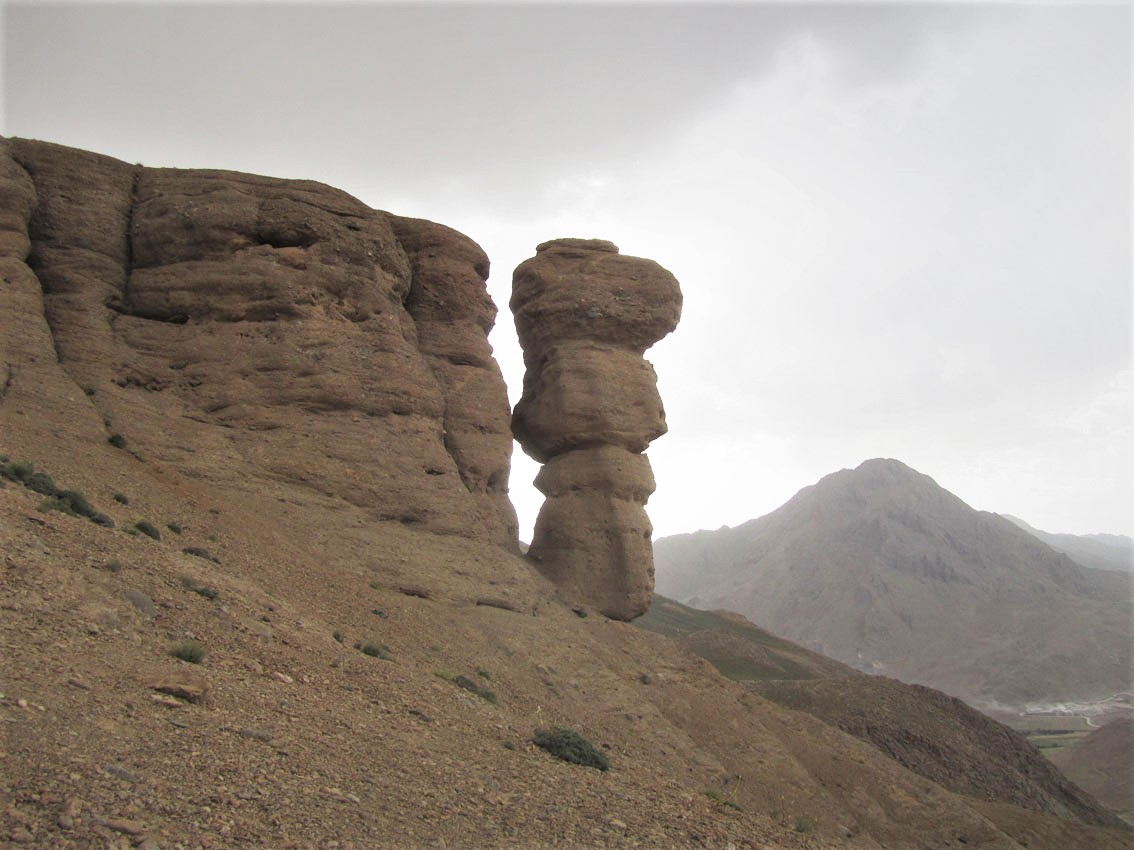
- Gorz-e-Rostam in June 2015

- Location within Iran
- Coordinates: 32°06′35″N 50°53′06″E
- Country: Iran
- Province: Chaharmahal and Bakhtiari
- County: Kiar
- District: Kiar-e Sharqi
- Rural District: Kiar-e Bala
- Elevation: 2,019 m (6,624 ft)

Population (2016)
  - Total: 2,919
- Time zone: UTC+3:30 (IRST)

Sarteshniz (Persian: سرتشنيز) (Note: Also romanized as Sar-e Teshnīz and Sarteshnīz; also known as Sar-i-Tīshnīz) is a village in, and the capital of, Kiar-e Bala Rural District in Kiar-e Sharqi District of Kiar County, Chaharmahal and Bakhtiari province, Iran.

== Demographics ==
=== Ethnicity ===
The village is populated by Persians who speak the Shirazi dialect.

=== Population ===
At the time of the 2006 National Census, the village's population was 2,959 in 634 households, when it was in Kiar-e Sharqi Rural District (Note: Formerly Dastgerd Rural District) of the former Kiar District in Shahrekord County. The following census in 2011 counted 3,055 people in 823 households, by which time the district had been separated from the county in the establishment of Kiar County. The rural district was transferred to the new Central District. The 2016 census measured the population of the village as 2,919 people in 856 households.

In 2023, the rural district was separated from the district in the formation of Kiar-e Sharqi District. Sarteshniz was transferred to Kiar-e Bala Rural District created in the new district.

== Tourist attractions ==
Gorz-e-Rostam (Tana) Cave (گرز رستم) is a geological phenomenon located to the north of Sarteshniz.

== Industry ==
The village's sole industrial complex is the Kiar Flour Production Company south of the village. The factory is responsible for providing the eastern region of the province with numerous types of flour.
