= Musaabad, Kiar =

Village in Chaharmahal and Bakhtiari province, Iran

Musaabad Persian: موسی‌آباد
- Village
- Location within Iran
- Coordinates: 32°05′39″N 50°54′10″E
- Country: Iran
- Province: Chaharmahal and Bakhtiari
- County: Kiar
- District: Kiar-e Sharqi
- Rural District: Kiar-e Bala

Population (2016)
  - Total: 591
- Time zone: UTC+3:30 (IRST)

Musaabad (Persian: موسی‌آباد) (Note: Also romanized as Moosa Abad, Mūsáābād, and Mūsīābād; also known as Mūsá) is a village in Kiar-e Bala Rural District of Kiar-e Sharqi District in Kiar County, Chaharmahal and Bakhtiari province, Iran.

== Demographics ==
=== Ethnicity ===
The village is populated by Lurs.

=== Population ===
At the time of the 2006 National Census, the village's population was 607 in 145 households, when it was in Kiar-e Sharqi Rural District (Note: Formerly Dastgerd Rural District) of the former Kiar District in Shahrekord County. The following census in 2011 counted 633 people in 184 households, by which time the district had been separated from the county in the establishment of Kiar County. The rural district was transferred to the new Central District. The 2016 census measured the population of the village as 591 people in 179 households.

In 2023, the rural district was separated from the district in the formation of Kiar-e Sharqi District. Musaabad was transferred to Kiar-e Bala Rural District created in the new district.
