= Dastgerd-e Emamzadeh =

Village in Chaharmahal and Bakhtiari province, Iran

Dastgerd-e Emamzadeh Persian: دستگردامامزاده
- Village
- Location within Iran
- Coordinates: 32°05′59″N 50°59′14″E
- Country: Iran
- Province: Chaharmahal and Bakhtiari
- County: Farrokhshahr
- District: Dastgerd
- Rural District: Dastgerd

Population (2016)
  - Total: 2,810
- Time zone: UTC+3:30 (IRST)

Dastgerd-e Emamzadeh (Persian: دستگردامامزاده) (Note: Also romanized as Dastgerd Emāmzādeh and Dastgerd-e Emāmzādeh; also known as Dastgerd and Emāmzādeh Dastgerd) is a village in Dastgerd Rural District of Dastgerd District in Farrokhshahr County, Chaharmahal and Bakhtiari province, Iran, serving as capital of both the district and the rural district.

== Demographics ==
=== Ethnicity ===
The village is populated by Lurs.

=== Population ===
At the time of the 2006 National Census, the village's population was 3,270 in 831 households, when it was in the former Kiar District of Shahrekord County. The following census in 2011 counted 3,261 people in 957 households, by which time the district had been separated from the county in the establishment of Kiar County. The 2016 census measured the population of the village as 2,810 people in 871 households, when the rural district had been separated from the county in the formation of Farrokhshahr District in Shahrekord County. It was the most populous village in its rural district.

In 2023, the district was separated from the county in the establishment of Farrokhshahr County, and the rural district was transferred to the new Dastgerd District.
