= Teshniz =

Village in Chaharmahal and Bakhtiari province, Iran

Teshniz Persian: تشنيز
- Village
- Location within Iran
- Coordinates: 32°04′25″N 50°48′00″E
- Country: Iran
- Province: Chaharmahal and Bakhtiari
- County: Kiar
- District: Central
- Rural District: Kharaji

Population (2016)
  - Total: 1,538
- Time zone: UTC+3:30 (IRST)

Teshniz (Persian: تشنيز) (Note: Also romanized as Tashneez and Teshnīz) is a village in Kharaji Rural District of the Central District in Kiar County, Chaharmahal and Bakhtiari province, Iran.

== Demographics ==
=== Ethnicity ===
The village is populated by Lurs.

=== Population ===
At the time of the 2006 National Census, the village's population was 1,639 in 433 households, when it was in Kiar-e Gharbi Rural District (Note: Formerly Shalamzar Rural District) of the former Kiar District in Shahrekord County. The following census in 2011 counted 1,584 people in 490 households, by which time the district had been separated from the county in the establishment of Kiar County. The rural district was transferred to the new Central District. The 2016 census measured the population of the village as 1,538 people in 494 households.

In 2023, Teshniz was transferred to Kharaji Rural District created in the district.
