= Qaleh Salim =

Village in Chaharmahal and Bakhtiari province, Iran

Qaleh Salim Persian: قلعه سليم
- Village
- Location within Iran
- Coordinates: 32°05′35″N 50°57′21″E
- Country: Iran
- Province: Chaharmahal and Bakhtiari
- County: Kiar
- District: Kiar-e Sharqi
- Rural District: Kiar-e Sharqi

Population (2016)
  - Total: 303
- Time zone: UTC+3:30 (IRST)

Qaleh Salim (Persian: قلعه سليم) (Note: Also romanized as Qal‘eh Salīm; also known as Ghal‘eh Salim) is a village in Kiar-e Sharqi Rural District (Note: Formerly Dastgerd Rural District) of Kiar-e Sharqi District in Kiar County, Chaharmahal and Bakhtiari province, Iran.

== Demographics ==
=== Ethnicity ===
The village is populated by Lurs.

=== Population ===
At the time of the 2006 National Census, the village's population was 439 in 111 households, when it was in the former Kiar District of Shahrekord County. The following census in 2011 counted 383 people in 116 households, by which time the district had been separated from the county in the establishment of Kiar County. The rural district was transferred to the new Central District. The 2016 census measured the population of the village as 303 people in 93 households.

In 2023, the rural district was separated from the district in the formation of Kiar-e Sharqi District
