= Surk Rural District (Farrokhshahr County) =

Rural district in Chaharmahal and Bakhtiari province, Iran

Surk Rural District Persian: دهستان سورک
- Rural District
- Location within Iran
- Coordinates: 32°03′N 51°03′E
- Country: Iran
- Province: Chaharmahal and Bakhtiari
- County: Farrokhshahr
- District: Dastgerd
- Established: 2023
- Capital: Surk
- Time zone: UTC+3:30 (IRST)

Surk Rural District (Persian: دهستان سورک) is in Dastgerd District of Farrokhshahr County, Chaharmahal and Bakhtiari province, Iran. Its capital is the village of Surk, whose population at the time of the 2016 National Census was 1,206 people in 363 households.

== History ==
In 2013, the city of Farrokh Shahr was separated from the Central District of Shahrekord County, and Dastgerd Rural District from Kiar County, in the formation of Farrokhshahr District.

In 2023, the district was separated from the county in the establishment of Farrokhshahr County, and Surk Rural District was created in the new Dastgerd District.

== Other villages in the rural district ==
- Irancheh
