= Tavakkoli =

Tavakkoli (Persian: توكلي) may refer to

== People ==
- Tavakkoli (surname)
- Tavakkoli Dede (died 1625), Bosnian poet from Sarajevo

== Places ==
- Aqajan-e Tavakkoli
- Deh Now-ye Tavakkoli
- Hasanabad-e Tavakkoli, a village in Iran
- Shahriar-e Tavakkoli
- Qaleh-ye Tavakkoli

== See also ==
- Tawakkul (disambiguation)
- Tavakoli
