= Jaghdan =

Village in Chaharmahal and Bakhtiari province, Iran

Jaghdan Persian: جغدان
- Village
- Location within Iran
- Coordinates: 31°53′31″N 50°45′48″E
- Country: Iran
- Province: Chaharmahal and Bakhtiari
- County: Kiar
- District: Naghan
- Rural District: Naghan

Population (2016)
  - Total: 523
- Time zone: UTC+3:30 (IRST)

Jaghdan (Persian: جغدان) (Note: Also romanized as Jaghdān and Joghdan; also known as Jaqdān) is a village in Naghan Rural District of Naghan District in Kiar County, Chaharmahal and Bakhtiari province, Iran.

== Demographics ==
=== Ethnicity ===
The village is populated by Lurs.

=== Population ===
At the time of the 2006 National Census, the village's population was 676 in 159 households, when it was in the Central District of Ardal County. The following census in 2011 counted 630 people in 160 households, by which time the rural district had been separated from the county in the establishment of Kiar County and transferred to the new Naghan District. The 2016 census measured the population of the village as 523 people in 156 households.
