= Kharaji, Chaharmahal and Bakhtiari =

Village in Chaharmahal and Bakhtiari province, Iran

Kharaji Persian: خراجي
- Village
- Location within Iran
- Coordinates: 32°05′40″N 50°49′49″E
- Country: Iran
- Province: Chaharmahal and Bakhtiari
- County: Kiar
- District: Central
- Rural District: Kharaji

Population (2016)
  - Total: 2,880
- Time zone: UTC+3:30 (IRST)

Kharaji (Persian: خراجي) (Note: Also romanized as Kharājī and Kherāji; also known as Khāriji) is a village in, and the capital of, Kharaji Rural District in the Central District of Kiar County, Chaharmahal and Bakhtiari province, Iran.

== Demographics ==
=== Ethnicity ===
The village is populated by Lurs.

=== Population ===
At the time of the 2006 National Census, the village's population was 3,078 in 772 households, when it was in Kiar-e Gharbi Rural District (Note: Formerly Shalamzar Rural District) of the former Kiar District in Shahrekord County. The following census in 2011 counted 3,113 people in 964 households, by which time the district had been separated from the county in the establishment of Kiar County. The rural district was transferred to the new Central District. The 2016 census measured the population of the village as 2,880 people in 947 households. It was the most populous village in its rural district.

In 2023, Kharaji was transferred to Kharaji Rural District created in the district.
