= Qaleh Tak, Kiar =

Village in Chaharmahal and Bakhtiari province, Iran

Qaleh Tak Persian: قلعه تك
- Village
- Location within Iran
- Coordinates: 32°07′44″N 50°46′47″E
- Country: Iran
- Province: Chaharmahal and Bakhtiari
- County: Kiar
- District: Central
- Rural District: Kharaji

Population (2016)
  - Total: 707
- Time zone: UTC+3:30 (IRST)

Qaleh Tak (Persian: قلعه تك) (Note: Also romanized as Qal‘eh Tak; also known as Ghal‘eh Tak) is a village in Kharaji Rural District of the Central District in Kiar County, Chaharmahal and Bakhtiari province, Iran.

== Population ==
At the time of the 2006 National Census, the village's population was 822 in 208 households, when it was in Kiar-e Gharbi Rural District (Note: Formerly Shalamzar Rural District) of the former Kiar District in Shahrekord County. The following census in 2011 counted 734 people in 206 households, by which time the district had been separated from the county in the establishment of Kiar County. The rural district was transferred to the new Central District. The 2016 census measured the population of the village as 707 people in 203 households.

In 2023, Qaleh Tak was transferred to Kharaji Rural District created in the district.
