= Chehraz =

Village in Chaharmahal and Bakhtiari province, Iran

Chehraz Persian: چهراز
- Village
- Location within Iran
- Coordinates: 31°52′44″N 50°46′15″E
- Country: Iran
- Province: Chaharmahal and Bakhtiari
- County: Kiar
- District: Naghan
- Rural District: Naghan

Population (2016)
  - Total: 371
- Time zone: UTC+3:30 (IRST)

Chehraz (Persian: چهراز) (Note: Also romanized as Chehrāz) is a village in Naghan Rural District of Naghan District in Kiar County, Chaharmahal and Bakhtiari province, Iran.

== Demographics ==
=== Ethnicity ===
The village is populated by Lurs.

=== Population ===
At the time of the 2006 National Census, the village's population was 519 in 108 households, when it was in the Central District of Ardal County. The following census in 2011 counted 457 people in 110 households, by which time the rural district had been separated from the county in the establishment of Kiar County and transferred to the new Naghan District. The 2016 census measured the population of the village as 371 people in 112 households.
