= Qaleh-ye Mamka =

Village in Chaharmahal and Bakhtiari province, Iran

Qaleh-ye Mamka Persian: قلعه ممكا
- Village
- Location within Iran
- Coordinates: 31°58′38″N 50°57′13″E
- Country: Iran
- Province: Chaharmahal and Bakhtiari
- County: Kiar
- District: Central
- Rural District: Kiar-e Gharbi

Population (2016)
  - Total: 750
- Time zone: UTC+3:30 (IRST)

Qaleh-ye Mamka (Persian: قلعه ممكا) (Note: Also romanized as Qal‘eh Mamāka, Qal‘eh-ye Mamakā, and Qal‘eh-ye Mamkā; also known as Ghal‘eh Mamaka) is a village in Kiar-e Gharbi Rural District (Note: Formerly Shalamzar Rural District) of the Central District in Kiar County, Chaharmahal and Bakhtiari province, Iran.

== Demographics ==
=== Ethnicity ===
The village is populated by Lurs.

=== Population ===
At the time of the 2006 National Census, the village's population was 794 in 209 households, when it was in the former Kiar District of Shahrekord County. The following census in 2011 counted 768 people in 234 households, by which time the district had been separated from the county in the establishment of Kiar County. The rural district was transferred to the new Central District. The 2016 census measured the population of the village as 750 people in 233 households.
