= Mashayekh =

Mashayekh (Persian: مشايخ) may refer to:

- Mashayekh, East Azerbaijan
- Mashayekh, Kazerun, Fars Province
- Mashayekh, Mamasani, Fars Province
- Mashayekh Rural District (disambiguation)
