= Dam Ab =

Dam Ab or Dam-e Ab or Domab (Persian: دم اب or دماب) may refer to:

- Dam Ab, Ardal, Chaharmahal and Bakhtiari Province
- Dam Ab, Kiar, Chaharmahal and Bakhtiari Province
- Dam Ab, Lordegan, Chaharmahal and Bakhtiari Province
- Domab, Isfahan
- Dam Ab, Bagh-e Malek, Khuzestan Province
- Dam Ab, Masjed Soleyman, Khuzestan Province
