= Qahfarrokh Rural District =

Rural district in Chaharmahal and Bakhtiari province, Iran

Qahfarrokh Rural District Persian: دهستان قهفرخ
- Rural District
- Location within Iran
- Coordinates: 32°15′N 51°03′E
- Country: Iran
- Province: Chaharmahal and Bakhtiari
- County: Farrokhshahr
- District: Central
- Established: 2013
- Capital: Kheyrabad

Population (2016)
  - Total: 979
- Time zone: UTC+3:30 (IRST)

Qahfarrokh Rural District (Persian: دهستان قهفرخ) is in the Central District of Farrokhshahr County, Chaharmahal and Bakhtiari province, Iran. Its capital is the village of Kheyrabad.

== History ==
In 2013, the city of Farrokh Shahr was separated from the Central District of Shahrekord County, and Dastgerd Rural District from Kiar County, in the formation of Farrokhshahr District. Qahfarrokh Rural District was created in the new district.

== Demographics ==
=== Population ===
At the time of the 2016 census, the rural district's population (as a part of the former Farrokhshahr District in Shahrekord County) was 979 in 301 households. Its only village was Kheyrabad, with 979 people.

In 2023, the district was separated from the county in the establishment of Farrokhshahr County, and the rural district was transferred to the new Central District.
