= Kahandezh =

Village in Chaharmahal and Bakhtiari province, Iran

Kahandezh Persian: کهن‌دژ
- Village
- Location within Iran
- Coordinates: 31°56′23″N 50°38′06″E
- Country: Iran
- Province: Chaharmahal and Bakhtiari
- County: Kiar
- District: Naghan
- Rural District: Naghan

Population (2016)
  - Total: 71
- Time zone: UTC+3:30 (IRST)

Kahandezh (Persian: کهن‌دژ) (Note: Also romanized as Kāhāndezh; formerly Gav Tut (گاوتوت), also romanized as Gāv Tūt) is a village in Naghan Rural District of Naghan District in Kiar County, Chaharmahal and Bakhtiari province, Iran.

== Demographics ==
=== Ethnicity ===
The village is populated by Lurs.

=== Population ===
At the time of the 2006 National Census, the village's population was 50 in 12 households, when it was in the Central District of Ardal County. The following census in 2011 counted 33 people in 10 households, by which time the rural district had been separated from the county in the establishment of Kiar County and was transferred to the new Naghan District. The 2016 census measured the population of the village as 71 people in 24 households.
