= Heydarabad, Kiar =

Village in Chaharmahal and Bakhtiari province, Iran

Heydarabad Persian: حیدرآباد
- Village
- Location within Iran
- Coordinates: 31°52′00″N 50°46′34″E
- Country: Iran
- Province: Chaharmahal and Bakhtiari
- County: Kiar
- District: Naghan
- Rural District: Naghan

Population (2016)
  - Total: 525
- Time zone: UTC+3:30 (IRST)

Heydarabad (Persian: حیدرآباد) (Note: Also romanized as Ḩeydarābād; formerly known as Adelabad (عادل اباد), also romanized as ʿĀdelābād) is a village in Naghan Rural District of Naghan District in Kiar County, Chaharmahal and Bakhtiari province, Iran.

== Demographics ==
=== Ethnicity ===
The village is populated by Lurs.

=== Population ===
At the time of the 2006 National Census, the village's population was 621 in 125 households, when it was in the Central District of Ardal County. The following census in 2011 counted 564 people in 151 households, by which time the rural district had been separated from the county in the establishment of Kiar County and transferred to the new Naghan District. The 2016 census measured the population of the village as 525 people in 149 households. It was the most populous village in its rural district.
