= Jowzestan, Chaharmahal and Bakhtiari =

Village in Chaharmahal and Bakhtiari province, Iran

Jowzestan Persian: جوزستان
- Village
- Location within Iran
- Coordinates: 31°52′07″N 50°37′36″E
- Country: Iran
- Province: Chaharmahal and Bakhtiari
- County: Kiar
- District: Naghan
- Rural District: Mashayekh

Population (2016)
  - Total: 509
- Time zone: UTC+3:30 (IRST)

Jowzestan (Persian: جوزستان) (Note: Also romanized as Jowzestān) is a village in Mashayekh Rural District of Naghan District in Kiar County, Chaharmahal and Bakhtiari province, Iran.

== Demographics ==
=== Ethnicity ===
The village is populated by Lurs.

=== Population ===
At the time of the 2006 National Census, the village's population was 511 in 122 households, when it was in the Central District of Ardal County. The following census in 2011 counted 598 people in 132 households, by which time it had been separated from the county in the establishment of Kiar County. The rural district was transferred to the new Naghan District. The 2016 census measured the population of the village as 509 people in 151 households.
