= Sarrak, Iran =

Sarrok سررك
- Village
- Location within Iran
- Coordinates: 31°43′23″N 50°52′21″E
- Country: Iran
- Province: Chaharmahal and Bakhtiari
- County: Kiar
- Bakhsh: Naghan
- Rural District: Mashayekh

Population (2016)
  - Total: 380
- Time zone: UTC+3:30 (IRST)
  - Summer (DST): UTC+4:30 (IRDT)

Sarrok (Persian: سررك, also Romanized as Sarrok and Sar Rok; also known as Sarrūk and Sarūk) is a village in Mashayekh Rural District, Naghan District, Kiar County, Chaharmahal and Bakhtiari Province, Iran. At the 2016 census, its population was 380, in 74 families.
