= Qalatak =

Qalatak (Persian: قلاتك) may refer to:

- Qalatak, Chaharmahal and Bakhtiari
- Qalatak, Fars
- Qalatak, Kohgiluyeh and Boyer-Ahmad
