= Dezak, Chaharmahal and Bakhtiari =

Village in Chaharmahal and Bakhtiari province, Iran

Dezak Persian: دزک
- Village
- Location within Iran
- Coordinates: 32°05′11″N 50°57′47″E
- Country: Iran
- Province: Chaharmahal and Bakhtiari
- County: Kiar
- District: Kiar-e Sharqi
- Rural District: Kiar-e Sharqi

Population (2016)
  - Total: 2,942
- Time zone: UTC+3:30 (IRST)

Dezak (Persian: دزک) (Note: Also known as Deh-e Zak) is a village in Kiar-e Sharqi Rural District (Note: Formerly Dastgerd Rural District) of Kiar-e Sharqi District in Kiar County, Chaharmahal and Bakhtiari province, Iran, serving as capital of both the district and the rural district.

== Demographics ==
=== Ethnicity ===
The village is populated by Lurs.

=== Population ===
At the time of the 2006 National Census, the village's population was 3,133 in 775 households, when it was in the former Kiar District of Shahrekord County. The following census in 2011 counted 3,156 people in 886 households, by which time the district had been separated from the county in the establishment of Kiar County. The rural district was transferred to the new Central District. The 2016 census measured the population of the village as 2,942 people in 881 households. It was the most populous village in its rural district.

In 2023, the rural district was separated from the district in the formation of Kiar-e Sharqi District.
