= Kharaji Rural District =

Rural district in Chaharmahal and Bakhtiari province, Iran

Kharaji Rural District Persian: دهستان خراجی
- Rural District
- Location within Iran
- Coordinates: 32°06′N 50°48′E
- Country: Iran
- Province: Chaharmahal and Bakhtiari
- County: Kiar
- District: Central
- Established: 2023
- Capital: Kharaji
- Time zone: UTC+3:30 (IRST)

Kharaji Rural District (Persian: دهستان خراجی) is in the Central District of Kiar County, Chaharmahal and Bakhtiari province, Iran. Its capital is the village of Kharaji.

== History ==
In 2007, Kiar District of Shahrekord County, and Mashayekh and Naghan Rural Districts, and the city of Naghan, were separated from Ardal County in the establishment of Kiar County.

Kharaji Rural District was created in the Central District in 2023.

== Other villages in the rural district ==
- Qaleh Tak
- Teshniz
