= Do Polan =

Village in Chaharmahal and Bakhtiari province, Iran

Do Polan Persian: دوپلان
- Village
- Location within Iran
- Coordinates: 31°55′13″N 50°36′15″E
- Country: Iran
- Province: Chaharmahal and Bakhtiari
- County: Kiar
- District: Naghan
- Rural District: Mashayekh

Population (2016)
  - Total: 439
- Time zone: UTC+3:30 (IRST)

Do Polan (Persian: دوپلان) (Note: Also romanized as Do Polān and Dooplan; also known as Du Pulān) is a village in, and the capital of, Mashayekh Rural District in Naghan District of Kiar County, Chaharmahal and Bakhtiari province, Iran.

== Demographics ==
=== Ethnicity ===
The village is populated by Lurs.

=== Population ===
At the time of the 2006 National Census, the village's population was 431 in 98 households, when it was in the Central District of Ardal County. The following census in 2011 counted 398 people in 100 households, by which time it had been separated from the county in the establishment of Kiar County. The rural district was transferred to the new Naghan District. The 2016 census measured the population of the village as 439 people in 98 households.
