= Sarenjelak =

Sarenjelak سرنجلك
- Village
- Location within Iran
- Coordinates: 30°04′55″N 51°53′25″E
- Country: Iran
- Province: Fars
- County: Mamasani
- Bakhsh: Doshman Ziari
- Rural District: Doshman Ziari

Population (2006)
  - Total: 360
- Time zone: UTC+3:30 (IRST)
  - Summer (DST): UTC+4:30 (IRDT)

Sarenjelak (Persian: سرنجلك, also Romanized as Serenjelak; also known as Sar Anjīlak) is a village in Doshman Ziari Rural District, Doshman Ziari District, Mamasani County, Fars province, Iran. At the 2006 census, its population was 360, in 109 families.
