= Shahrak-e Kola Siah =

Shahrak-e Kola Siah شهرك كلاسياه
- Village
- Location within Iran
- Coordinates: 29°56′43″N 51°51′50″E
- Country: Iran
- Province: Fars
- County: Mamasani
- Bakhsh: Doshman Ziari
- Rural District: Mashayekh

Population (2006)
  - Total: 811
- Time zone: UTC+3:30 (IRST)
  - Summer (DST): UTC+4:30 (IRDT)

Shahrak-e Kola Siah (Persian: شهرك كلاسياه, also Romanized as Shahrak-e Kolāh Sīāh; also known as Kolāh Sīāh) is a village in Mashayekh Rural District, Doshman Ziari District, Mamasani County, Fars province, Iran. At the 2006 census, its population was 811, in 235 families.
