= Absharan =

Absharan (Persian: ابشاران) may refer to:

- Absharan-e Olya
- Absharan-e Sofla

== See also ==
- Abshar (disambiguation)
