= Shahrak-e Durak =

Village in Chaharmahal and Bakhtiari province, Iran

Shahrak-e Durak Persian: شهرك دورك
- Village
- Location within Iran
- Country: Iran
- Province: Chaharmahal and Bakhtiari
- County: Kiar
- District: Naghan
- Rural District: Mashayekh

Population (2016)
  - Total: 664
- Time zone: UTC+3:30 (IRST)

Shahrak-e Durak (Persian: شهرك دورك) (Note: Also romanized as Shahrak-e Dūrak; also known as Dūrak) is a village in Mashayekh Rural District of Naghan District in Kiar County, Chaharmahal and Bakhtiari province, Iran.

== Demographics ==
=== Ethnicity ===
The village is populated by Lurs.

=== Population ===
At the time of the 2006 National Census, the village's population was 680 in 174 households, when it was in the Central District of Ardal County. The following census in 2011 counted 985 people in 238 households, by which time it had been separated from the county in the establishment of Kiar County. The rural district was transferred to the new Naghan District. The 2016 census measured the population of the village as 664 people in 229 households.
