= Pir Hoseyni =

Pir Hoseyni پيرحسيني
- Village
- Location within Iran
- Coordinates: 29°57′03″N 52°01′48″E
- Country: Iran
- Province: Fars
- County: Mamasani
- Bakhsh: Doshman Ziari
- Rural District: Doshman Ziari

Population (2006)
  - Total: 85
- Time zone: UTC+3:30 (IRST)
  - Summer (DST): UTC+4:30 (IRDT)

Pir Hoseyni (Persian: پيرحسيني, also Romanized as Pīr Ḩoseynī) is a village in Doshman Ziari Rural District, Doshman Ziari District, Mamasani County, Fars province, Iran. At the 2006 census, its population was 85, in 19 families.
