= Bajgiran, Chaharmahal and Bakhtiari =

Bajgiran باجگيران
- Village
- Location within Iran
- Coordinates: 31°55′26″N 50°40′02″E
- Country: Iran
- Province: Chaharmahal and Bakhtiari
- County: Kiar
- Bakhsh: Naghan
- Rural District: Naghan

Population (2006)
  - Total: 313
- Time zone: UTC+3:30 (IRST)
  - Summer (DST): UTC+4:30 (IRDT)

Bajgiran (Persian: باجگيران, also Romanized as Bājgīrān) is a village in Naghan Rural District, Naghan District, Kiar County, Chaharmahal and Bakhtiari Province, Iran. At the 2006 census, its population was 313, in 79 families. The village is populated by Lurs.
