= Absharan-e Sofla =

Absharan-e Sofla ابشاران سفلي
- Village
- Country: Iran
- Province: Chaharmahal and Bakhtiari
- County: Kiar
- Bakhsh: Naghan
- Rural District: Mashayekh

Population (2006)
  - Total: 254
- Time zone: UTC+3:30 (IRST)
  - Summer (DST): UTC+4:30 (IRDT)

Absharan-e Sofla (Persian: ابشاران سفلي, also Romanized as Ābshārān-e Soflá) is a village in Mashayekh Rural District, Naghan District, Kiar County, Chaharmahal and Bakhtiari Province, Iran. At the 2006 census, its population was 254, in 52 families. The village is populated by Lurs.
