= Dam Ab, Kiar =

Dam Ab دم اب
- Village
- Location within Iran
- Coordinates: 31°52′25″N 50°43′28″E
- Country: Iran
- Province: Chaharmahal and Bakhtiari
- County: Kiar
- Bakhsh: Naghan
- Rural District: Naghan

Population (2006)
  - Total: 227
- Time zone: UTC+3:30 (IRST)
  - Summer (DST): UTC+4:30 (IRDT)

Dam Ab (Persian: دم‌آب, also Romanized as Dam Āb and Dam-e Āb) is a village in Naghan Rural District, Naghan District, Kiar County, Chaharmahal and Bakhtiari Province, Iran. At the 2006 census, its population was 227, in 59 families. The village is populated by Lurs.
