= Balutak (disambiguation) =

Balutak is a village in Fars Province, Iran.

Balutak (Persian: بلوطك) may also refer to:

- Balutak-e Sheykhan, Khuzestan Province

== See also ==
- Chal-e Balutak
