= Durak (disambiguation) =

Durak is a card game.

Durak may also refer to:

- Durak (surname)
- Durak, Iran (disambiguation)
- Durak, Adıyaman, a village in Adıyaman district of Adıyaman Province, Turkey
- Durak, Karaisalı, a village in Karaisalı district of Adana Province, Turkey
- Durak (film), a 2014 Russian crime drama film known as The Fool, written and directed by Yuri Bykov
- Đurak, surname
- Durak (Turkish makam theory)

== See also ==
- Durak Zenan (disambiguation)
