= Hasani Pacher =

Hasani Pachor حسني پاچر
- Village
- Location within Iran
- Coordinates: 30°01′40″N 51°58′40″E
- Country: Iran
- Province: Fars
- County: Mamasani
- Bakhsh: Doshman Ziari
- Rural District: Doshman Ziari

Population (2006)
  - Total: 397
- Time zone: UTC+3:30 (IRST)
  - Summer (DST): UTC+4:30 (IRDT)

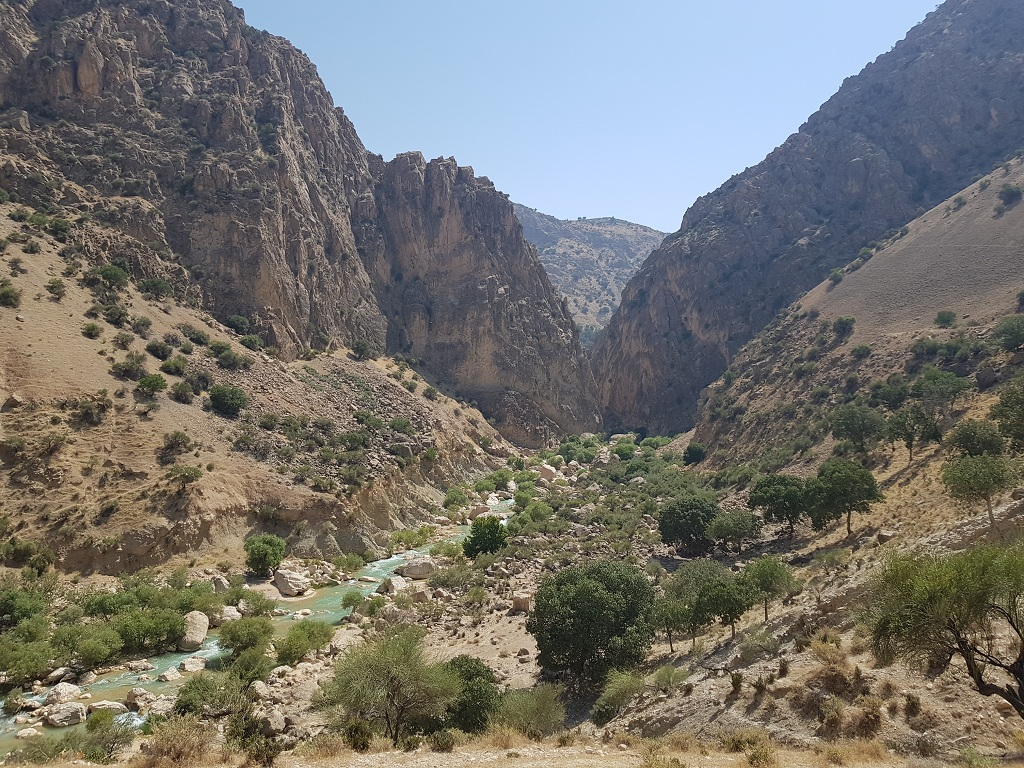

Hasani Pachor (Persian: حسني پاچر, also Romanized as Ḩasanī Pachor; also known as Ḩasanī and Ḩasanī Pāichor) is a village in Doshman Ziari Rural District, Doshman Ziari District, Mamasani County, Fars province, Iran. At the 2006 census, its population was 397, in 91 families.
