= Bajgiran (disambiguation) =

Bajgiran is a city in Razavi Khorasan Province, Iran.

Bajgiran (Persian: باجگيران) may also refer to:

- Bajgiran, Chaharmahal and Bakhtiari
- Bajgiran, Markazi
- Bajgiran District, in Razavi Khorasan Province
