= Kikomdan =

Kikomdan كيكمدان
- Village
- Location within Iran
- Coordinates: 30°00′29″N 51°52′35″E
- Country: Iran
- Province: Fars
- County: Mamasani
- Bakhsh: Doshman Ziari
- Rural District: Doshman Ziari

Population (2006)
  - Total: 39
- Time zone: UTC+3:30 (IRST)
  - Summer (DST): UTC+4:30 (IRDT)

Kikomdan (Persian: كيكمدان, also Romanized as Kīkomdān; also known as Kīkomdān-e Pā’īn) is a village in Doshman Ziari Rural District, Doshman Ziari District, Mamasani County, Fars province, Iran. At the 2006 census, its population was 39, in 12 families.
