= Durak-e Shapuri =

Durak-e Shapuri دورك شاپوري
- Village
- Location within Iran
- Coordinates: 31°47′22″N 50°43′48″E
- Country: Iran
- Province: Chaharmahal and Bakhtiari
- County: Kiar
- Bakhsh: Naghan
- Rural District: Mashayekh

Population (2006)
  - Total: 1,000
- Time zone: UTC+3:30 (IRST)
  - Summer (DST): UTC+4:30 (IRDT)

Durak-e Shahpuri (Persian: دورك شاپوري, also Romanized as Dūrak-e Shāhpūrī; also known as Dūrak) is a village in Mashayekh Rural District, Naghan District, Kiar County, Chaharmahal and Bakhtiari Province, Iran. At the 2006 census, its population was 1000, in 6 families.
