= Puraz, Chaharmahal and Bakhtiari =

Puraz پوراز
- Village
- Location within Iran
- Coordinates: 31°50′01″N 50°39′38″E
- Country: Iran
- Province: Chaharmahal and Bakhtiari
- County: Kiar
- Bakhsh: Naghan
- Rural District: Mashayekh

Population (2006)
  - Total: 36
- Time zone: UTC+3:30 (IRST)
  - Summer (DST): UTC+4:30 (IRDT)

Puraz (Persian: پوراز, also Romanized as Pūrāz, Pooraz, and Powrāz) is a village in Mashayekh Rural District, Naghan District, Kiar County, Chaharmahal and Bakhtiari Province, Iran. At the 2006 census, its population was 36, in 10 families. The village is populated by Lurs.
