= Berenjgan, Chaharmahal and Bakhtiari =

Village in Chaharmahal and Bakhtiari province, Iran

Berenjgan Persian: برنجگان
- Village
- Location within Iran
- Coordinates: 31°48′19″N 50°41′20″E
- Country: Iran
- Province: Chaharmahal and Bakhtiari
- County: Kiar
- District: Naghan
- Rural District: Mashayekh

Population (2016)
  - Total: 439
- Time zone: UTC+3:30 (IRST)

Berenjgan (Persian: برنجگان) (Note: Also romanized as Berenjgān) is a village in Mashayekh Rural District of Naghan District in Kiar County, Chaharmahal and Bakhtiari province, Iran.

== Demographics ==
=== Ethnicity ===
The village is populated by Lurs.

=== Population ===
At the time of the 2006 National Census, the village's population was 361 in 84 households, when it was in the Central District of Ardal County. The following census in 2011 counted 353 people in 82 households, by which time it had been separated from the county in the establishment of Kiar County. The rural district was transferred to the new Naghan District. The 2016 census measured the population of the village as 439 people in 127 households.
