= Chahar Taq, Chaharmahal and Bakhtiari =

Chahar Taq چهارطاق
- Village
- Location within Iran
- Coordinates: 31°50′18″N 50°50′03″E
- Country: Iran
- Province: Chaharmahal and Bakhtiari
- County: Kiar
- Bakhsh: Naghan
- Rural District: Naghan

Population (2006)
  - Total: 210
- Time zone: UTC+3:30 (IRST)
  - Summer (DST): UTC+4:30 (IRDT)

Chahar Taq (Persian: چهارطاق, also Romanized as Chahār Ţāq) is a village in Naghan Rural District, Naghan District, Kiar County, Chaharmahal and Bakhtiari Province, Iran. At the 2006 census, its population was 210, with 50 families. The village is populated by Lurs.

== History ==
With the break out of Iran-Iraq war in 1980, the fields around the Chahar Taq were bulldozed for use by the Iranian military. Some bulldozed debris was piled on top of the previously exposed archaeological remains. With termination of the hostilities, when the military left the region, the flat area around the Chahar Taq became attractive place for the villagers of old Zardeh to build new homes.
