= Salm, Chaharmahal and Bakhtiari =

Village in Chaharmahal and Bakhtiari province, Iran

Salm Persian: سلم
- Village
- Location within Iran
- Coordinates: 32°04′03″N 50°44′58″E
- Country: Iran
- Province: Chaharmahal and Bakhtiari
- County: Kiar
- District: Central
- Rural District: Kiar-e Gharbi

Population (2016)
  - Total: 1,213
- Time zone: UTC+3:30 (IRST)

Salm (Persian: سلم) (Note: Also romanized as Salam) is a village in Kiar-e Gharbi Rural District (Note: Formerly Shalamzar Rural District) of the Central District in Kiar County, Chaharmahal and Bakhtiari province, Iran.

== Demographics ==
=== Ethnicity ===
The village is populated by Lurs.

=== Population ===
At the time of the 2006 National Census, the village's population was 1,454 in 330 households, when it was in the former Kiar District of Shahrekord County. The following census in 2011 counted 1,481 people in 446 households, by which time the district had been separated from the county in the establishment of Kiar County. The rural district was transferred to the new Central District. The 2016 census measured the population of the village as 1,213 people in 407 households.
