= Absharan-e Olya =

Absharan-e Olya ابشاران عليا
- Village
- Country: Iran
- Province: Chaharmahal and Bakhtiari
- County: Kiar
- Bakhsh: Naghan
- Rural District: Mashayekh

Population (2006)
  - Total: 249
- Time zone: UTC+3:30 (IRST)
  - Summer (DST): UTC+4:30 (IRDT)

Absharan-e Olya (Persian: ابشاران عليا, also Romanized as Ābshārān-e ‘Olyā) is a village in Mashayekh Rural District, Naghan District, Kiar County, Chaharmahal and Bakhtiari Province, Iran. At the 2006 census, its population was 249, in 53 families. The village is populated by Lurs.
