= Dastana, Chaharmahal and Bakhtiari =

City in Chaharmahal and Bakhtiari province, Iran

Dastana Persian: دستنا
- City
- Location within Iran
- Coordinates: 32°03′36″N 50°46′15″E
- Country: Iran
- Province: Chaharmahal and Bakhtiari
- County: Kiar
- District: Central
- Established as a city: 2011

Population (2016)
  - Total: 5,143
- Time zone: UTC+3:30 (IRST)

Dastana (Persian: دستنا) (Note: Also romanized as Dastanā; also known as Dasht-e Taneh, Dasht-i-Tana, Dast-e Nā, and Dastnā’) is a city in the Central District of Kiar County, Chaharmahal and Bakhtiari province, Iran.

== Demographics ==
=== Ethnicity ===
The city is populated by Lurs.

=== Population ===
At the time of the 2006 National Census, Dastana's population was 5,111 in 1,345 households, when it was a village in Kiar-e Gharbi Rural District (Note: Formerly Shalamzar Rural District) of the former Kiar District in Shahrekord County. The following census in 2011 counted 5,199 people in 1,577 households, by which time the district had been separated from the county in the establishment of Kiar County. The rural district was transferred to the new Central District, and Dastana was converted to a city. The 2016 census measured the population of the city as 5,143 people in 1,615 households.
