= Central District (Farrokhshahr County) =

District in Chaharmahal and Bakhtiari province, Iran

Central District (Farrokhshahr County) Persian: بخش مرکزی شهرستان فرخ‌شهر
- District
- Location within Iran
- Coordinates: 32°15′N 51°03′E
- Country: Iran
- Province: Chaharmahal and Bakhtiari
- County: Farrokhshahr
- Established: 2023
- Capital: Farrokh Shahr
- Time zone: UTC+3:30 (IRST)

The Central District of Farrokhshahr County (Persian: بخش مرکزی شهرستان فرخ‌شهر) is in Chaharmahal and Bakhtiari province, Iran. Its capital is the city of Farrokh Shahr, whose population at the time of the 2016 National Census was 31,739 people in 9,292 households.

== History ==
In 2013, the city of Farrokh Shahr was separated from the Central District of Shahrekord County, and Dastgerd Rural District from Kiar County, in the formation of Farrokhshahr District.

In 2023, the district was separated from the county in the establishment of Farrokhshahr County, which was divided into two districts and three rural districts, with Farrokh Shahr as its capital and only city at the time.

== Demographics ==
=== Administrative divisions ===
Central District (Farrokhshahr County)
Administrative Divisions
Qahfarrokh RD
Farrokh Shahr (city)
RD = Rural District
