= Death of Sahar Khodayari =

Self-immolation of an Iranian woman

Sahar Khodayari
- سحر خدایاری
- Born: c. 1990; Salm, Iran
- Died: 9 September 2019 (aged 28–29); Tehran, Iran
- Cause of death: Suicide by self-immolation
- Resting place: Behesht-e Fatemeh, Qom (Iran)
- Education: BSE (Computer Engineering); BA (English Interpretation)
- Known for: Protesting Iranian governmental restrictions on women
- Criminal charge: Attempted entry into male-only Azadi Stadium
- Criminal penalty: Six months' imprisonment (not confirmed)

Sahar Khodayari (Persian: سحر خدایاری [sæhær xodɒjɒriː]; c. 1990 – 9 September 2019), also known as the Blue Girl, (Note: Blue is Esteghlal's jersey colour) was an Iranian football fan who immolated herself in Tehran to protest the national laws banning women from attending sports events and entering stadiums since the Islamic Revolution. She was a fan of Esteghlal F.C., and in March 2019, she attempted to gain entry at the male-only Azadi Stadium while disguised as a man to watch a match played by the team. On 2 September 2019, she was told by the Islamic Revolutionary Court that she might face a six-month prison sentence. After leaving court, she died by suicide through self-immolation in front of the building, succumbing to her injuries a week later. Khodayari's politicized suicide generated much debate in Iran about the government's restrictions on women.

FIFA, after Iran was chosen to host select qualifier games for the 2022 FIFA World Cup, stated that women must be allowed into the stadium to watch international football matches. A month after Sahar's death, women were admitted for the first time after 40 years.

== Incident and suicide ==
Sahar Khodayari was born in 1990 to a family in Salm, Kiar County, Chaharmahal and Bakhtiari Province, Iran. Her family includes a sister. The family later lived in Tehran. Khodayari graduated from university with degrees in English and in computer sciences. As a young woman she became a fan of the game of football. She was identified as "Blue Girl" on social media, after the colors of her favorite club, Esteghlal FC, based in Tehran.

In March 2019 Khodayari tried to enter Azadi Stadium to watch an AFC Champions League match between Esteghlal and Al Ain FC. Because women in Iran have been prohibited since 1981 from attending football matches, she disguised herself as a man to enter undetected. (Women may attend other sports, such as volleyball matches.) But the security guards noticed Khodayari and arrested her for violating the prohibition; they took her to the local NAJA. She was held for three nights in jail before being released on bail, pending her court case.

According to Amnesty International, Sahar Khodayari was ordered six months later to attend a Revolutionary Court in Tehran on 2 September 2019 to give a reason for her attempt to enter the stadium. She was charged with "openly committing a sinful act by appearing in public without a hijab" and "insulting officials". While no verdict was delivered in her case because the judge was unavailable, she was reportedly told she might face a six-month jail sentence. After Khodayari left the court, she poured petrol on herself and set herself on fire outside the courthouse.

She died in hospital one week later due to third-degree burns that she had suffered (approximately 90% of her skin surface area had been affected). According to DW, the six-month jail sentence had been affirmed while she was in hospital.

In October 2019, Iranian women were allowed to attend a football match in Iran for the first time in 40 years. However, in 2022, Iranian women were blocked from entering the stadium for a World Cup qualifier.

== Reactions ==
=== National ===
- Gholam Hossein Ismaili, the spokesman of the judicial system of Iran, claimed that Sahar Khodayari had not been convicted nor sentenced to 6 months' imprisonment, as was reported.
- In an interview with the state-owned TV, before her family was told not to speak to the media, her sister had said that Khodayari was receiving treatment for mental illness. There were rumors that she had tried to kill herself while in university. Because of this, authorities might have reduced charges against her, if they had chosen to do so.
- Ali Karimi said that Iranians should "boycott football matches to protest Khodayari's death."

=== Worldwide ===
- FIFA made a statement about Khodayari's death: "We are aware of that tragedy and deeply regret it." Iran was chosen to host 2022 FIFA World Cup qualification matches and FIFA had said the country must provide free entry of women to those international matches.
- Amnesty International said, "What happened to Sahar Khodayari is heart-breaking and exposes the impact of the Iranian authorities' appalling contempt for women's rights in the country."
- A spokesman for the U.S. Department of State said: "The death of the Blue Girl, Sahar Khodayari, is another proof for the fact that the Iranian people are the greatest victims of the Islamic regime."
- On 12 September 2019 an arrest warrant was issued for Saba Kamali, an Iranian actress, after her post on Instagram in support of Khodayari. She had published an imaginary dialogue with Husayn ibn Ali questioning the relevance of the ceremonial Ashura event compared to Iran's discriminatory laws.
- According to France 24, Iranian football fans reacted with shock and anger following Khodayari's death. By using #BanIRSportsFederations, Iranians called for the Islamic regime's sports federations to be banned from participating in world sport.
- Some local football stars and known figures responded to Khodayari's death with public statements.

== Film ==
The Recess is an Iran-Spain short film inspired by the story of Sahar Khodayari. Directed by Navid Nikkhah Azad, The Recess has been screened in more than 160 international film festivals including FIAPF-accredited, Oscar and Goya Awards qualifying festivals, and has won 32 awards.

== See also ==
- Homa Darabi
- Offside (2006 Iranian film)
- 2017–19 Iranian protests against compulsory hijab
- Convention on the Elimination of All Forms of Discrimination Against Women
