= Balmangan =

Balmangan بالمنگان
- Village
- Location within Iran
- Coordinates: 30°02′57″N 51°50′52″E
- Country: Iran
- Province: Fars
- County: Mamasani
- Bakhsh: Doshman Ziari
- Rural District: Doshman Ziari

Population (2006)
  - Total: 40
- Time zone: UTC+3:30 (IRST)
  - Summer (DST): UTC+4:30 (IRDT)

Balmangan (Persian: بالمنگان, also Romanized as Bālmangān) is a village in Doshman Ziari Rural District, Doshman Ziari District, Mamasani County, Fars province, Iran. At the 2006 census, its population was 40, in 11 families.
