= Qaleh Tak =

Qaleh Tak (Persian: قلعه تك), also rendered as Ghaleh Tak, may refer to:

- Qaleh Tak, Kiar
- Qaleh Tak, Kuhrang
