= Heydarabad-e Baba Monir =

Heydarabad-e Baba Monir حيدرابادبابامنير
- Village
- Location within Iran
- Coordinates: 29°53′11″N 52°05′49″E
- Country: Iran
- Province: Fars
- County: Mamasani
- Bakhsh: Doshman Ziari
- Rural District: Doshman Ziari

Population (2006)
  - Total: 23
- Time zone: UTC+3:30 (IRST)
  - Summer (DST): UTC+4:30 (IRDT)

Heydarabad-e Baba Monir (Persian: حيدرابادبابامنير, also Romanized as Ḩeydarābād-e Bābā Monīr; also known as Ḩeydarābād) is a village in Doshman Ziari Rural District, Doshman Ziari District, Mamasani County, Fasa province, Iran. At the 2006 census, its population was 23, in 4 families.
