= Tawakkul (disambiguation) =

Tawakkul (Arabic: تَوَكُّل, Persian: توكل) is an Islamic concept.

Tawakkul, Tawakkol or Tavakkol may also refer to:

== People ==
- Tawakkol Karman, or Tawakkul Karmān (born 1979), Yemeni journalist, politician, and human rights activist

== Places ==
- Tavakkol, Kurdistan
- Tavakkol, Mazandaran
- Tavakkol, Hirmand, Sistan and Baluchestan Province
- Tavakkol, Qasr-e Qand, Sistan and Baluchestan Province

== Other ==
- Tawakkul Operation, an Iranian military operation during the Iran–Iraq War, in January 1981

== See also ==
- Tavakkoli
