= Aqajan =

Aqajan (Persian: اقاجان) may refer to:

- Aqajan, East Azerbaijan
- Aqajan-e Tavakkol, Fars Province
- Aqajan, Lorestan
