= Madan, Chaharmahal and Bakhtiari =

Village in Chaharmahal and Bakhtiari province, Iran

Madan Persian: معدن
- Village
- Location within Iran
- Coordinates: 31°41′52″N 50°52′37″E
- Country: Iran
- Province: Chaharmahal and Bakhtiari
- County: Kiar
- District: Naghan
- Rural District: Mashayekh

Population (2016)
  - Total: 1,320
- Time zone: UTC+3:30 (IRST)

Madan (Persian: معدن) (Note: Also romanized as Ma’aden and Ma‘dan) is a village in Mashayekh Rural District of Naghan District in Kiar County, Chaharmahal and Bakhtiari province, Iran.

== Demographics ==
=== Population ===
At the time of the 2006 National Census, the village's population was 999 in 193 households, when it was in the Central District of Ardal County. The following census in 2011 counted 1,280 people in 274 households, by which time it had been separated from the county in the establishment of Kiar County. The rural district was transferred to the new Naghan District. The 2016 census measured the population of the village as 1,320 people in 326 households. It was the most populous village in its rural district.
