= Sar Rud, Fars =

Sar Rud سررود
- Village
- Location within Iran
- Coordinates: 29°54′24″N 52°05′03″E
- Country: Iran
- Province: Fars
- County: Mamasani
- Bakhsh: Doshman Ziari
- Rural District: Doshman Ziari

Population (2006)
  - Total: 268
- Time zone: UTC+3:30 (IRST)
  - Summer (DST): UTC+4:30 (IRDT)

Sar Rud (Persian: سررود, also Romanized as Sar Rūd) is a village in Doshman Ziari Rural District, Doshman Ziari District, Mamasani County, Fars province, Iran. At the 2006 census, its population was 268, in 56 families.
