= Dam Ab, Ardal =

Dam Ab دماب
- Village
- Location within Iran
- Coordinates: 31°58′59″N 50°12′43″E
- Country: Iran
- Province: Chaharmahal and Bakhtiari
- County: Ardal
- Bakhsh: Central
- Rural District: Dinaran

Population (2006)
  - Total: 45
- Time zone: UTC+3:30 (IRST)
  - Summer (DST): UTC+4:30 (IRDT)

Dam Ab (Persian: دماب, also Romanized as Dam Āb) is a village in Dinaran Rural District, in the Central District of Ardal County, Chaharmahal and Bakhtiari Province, Iran. At the 2006 census, its population was 45, in 9 families.
