= Mashayekh Rural District =

Mashayekh Rural District (Persian: دهستان مشايخ) may refer to:

- Mashayekh Rural District (Chaharmahal and Bakhtiari Province)
- Mashayekh Rural District (Fars Province)
