= Dasht-e Azadegan, Fars =

Village in Fars province, Iran

Dasht-e Azadegan Persian: دشت ازادگان
- Village
- Location within Iran
- Coordinates: 29°56′59″N 51°49′20″E
- Country: Iran
- Province: Fars
- County: Mamasani
- District: Doshman Ziari
- Rural District: Mashayekh

Population (2016)
  - Total: 1,148
- Time zone: UTC+3:30 (IRST)

Dasht-e Azadegan (Persian: دشت ازادگان) (Note: Also romanized as Dasht-e Āzādegān) is a village in Mashayekh Rural District of Doshman Ziari District, Mamasani County, Fars province, Iran.

== Demographics ==
=== Population ===
At the time of the 2006 National Census, the village's population was 1,339 in 308 households. The following census in 2011 counted 1,179 people in 320 households. The 2016 census measured the population of the village as 1,148 people in 363 households. It was the most populous village in its rural district.
