= Sar Chah, Chaharmahal and Bakhtiari =

Village in Chaharmahal and Bakhtiari province, Iran

Sar Chah Persian: سرچاه
- Village
- Location within Iran
- Coordinates: 31°59′49″N 50°31′40″E
- Country: Iran
- Province: Chaharmahal and Bakhtiari
- County: Ardal
- District: Central
- Rural District: Poshtkuh

Population (2016)
  - Total: 1,664
- Time zone: UTC+3:30 (IRST)

Sar Chah (Persian: سرچاه) (Note: Also romanized as Sar Chāh) is a village in Poshtkuh Rural District of the Central District in Ardal County, Chaharmahal and Bakhtiari province, Iran.

== Demographics ==
=== Ethnicity ===
The village is populated by Lurs.

=== Population ===
At the time of the 2006 National Census, the village's population was 1,857 in 375 households. The following census in 2011 counted 1,897 people in 469 households. The 2016 census measured the population of the village as 1,664 people in 470 households.
