= Puraz =

Puraz or Pooraz or Powraz (Persian: پوراز) may refer to:

- Puraz, Chaharmahal and Bakhtiari
- Puraz, Ardal, Chaharmahal and Bakhtiari Province
