= Tavakkolabad-e Markazi =

Tavakkolabad-e Markazi توكل ابادمركزي
- Village
- Location within Iran
- Coordinates: 29°58′26″N 52°00′29″E
- Country: Iran
- Province: Fars
- County: Mamasani
- Bakhsh: Doshman Ziari
- Rural District: Doshman Ziari

Population (2006)
  - Total: 391
- Time zone: UTC+3:30 (IRST)
  - Summer (DST): UTC+4:30 (IRDT)

Tavakkolabad-e Markazi (Persian: توكل ابادمركزي, also Romanized as Tavakkolābād-e Markazī; also known as Shahrīār-e Tavakkolī and Tavakkolābād) is a village in Doshman Ziari Rural District, Doshman Ziari District, Mamasani County, Fars province, Iran. At the 2006 census, its population was 391, in 93 families.
