= Doshman Ziari Rural District =

Doshman Ziari Rural District (Persian: دهستان دشمن زيارئ) may refer to:

- Doshman Ziari Rural District (Fars Province)
- Doshman Ziari Rural District (Kohgiluyeh and Boyer-Ahmad Province)
