= Deh Kohneh-ye Rugar =

Village in Chaharmahal and Bakhtiari province, Iran

Deh Kohneh-ye Rugar Persian: ده كهنه روگر
- Village
- Location within Iran
- Coordinates: 31°58′11″N 50°34′09″E
- Country: Iran
- Province: Chaharmahal and Bakhtiari
- County: Ardal
- District: Central
- Rural District: Poshtkuh

Population (2016)
  - Total: 849
- Time zone: UTC+3:30 (IRST)

Deh Kohneh-ye Rugar (Persian: ده كهنه روگر) (Note: Also romanized as Deh Kohneh-ye Rūgar; also known as Deh Kohneh and Deh-e Kohneh) is a village in Poshtkuh Rural District of the Central District in Ardal County, Chaharmahal and Bakhtiari province, Iran.

== Demographics ==
=== Ethnicity ===
The village is populated by Lurs.

=== Population ===
At the time of the 2006 National Census, the village's population was 1,166 in 265 households. The following census in 2011 counted 1,124 people in 267 households. The 2016 census measured the population of the village as 849 people in 235 households.
