= Lir Abi, Ardal =

Village in Chaharmahal and Bakhtiari province, Iran

Lir Abi Persian: ليرابي
- Village
- Location within Iran
- Coordinates: 31°57′21″N 50°29′08″E
- Country: Iran
- Province: Chaharmahal and Bakhtiari
- County: Ardal
- District: Central
- Rural District: Dinaran

Population (2016)
  - Total: 1,189
- Time zone: UTC+3:30 (IRST)

Lir Abi (Persian: ليرابي) (Note: Also romanized as Līr Ābī) is a village in, and the capital of, Dinaran Rural District in the Central District of Ardal County, Chaharmahal and Bakhtiari province, Iran.

== Demographics ==
=== Ethnicity ===
The village is populated by Lurs.

=== Population ===
At the time of the 2006 National Census, the village's population was 870 in 154 households. The following census in 2011 counted 955 people in 160 households. The 2016 census measured the population of the village as 1,189 people in 284 households. It was the most populous village in its rural district.
