= Rostamabad, Chaharmahal and Bakhtiari =

Village in Chaharmahal and Bakhtiari province, Iran

Rostamabad Persian: رستم اباد
- Village
- Location within Iran
- Coordinates: 32°05′20″N 50°32′47″E
- Country: Iran
- Province: Chaharmahal and Bakhtiari
- County: Ardal
- District: Central
- Rural District: Poshtkuh

Population (2016)
  - Total: 1,037
- Time zone: UTC+3:30 (IRST)

Rostamabad (Persian: رستم اباد) (Note: Also romanized as Rostamābād; also known as Rostamī and Rustami) is a village in, and the capital of, Poshtkuh Rural District in the Central District of Ardal County, Chaharmahal and Bakhtiari province, Iran.

== Demographics ==
=== Ethnicity ===
The village is populated by Lurs.

=== Population ===
At the time of the 2006 National Census, the village's population was 1,091 in 276 households. The following census in 2011 counted 1,066 people in 319 households. The 2016 census measured the population of the village as 1,037 people in 302 households.
