= Alikuh =

Village in Chaharmahal and Bakhtiari province, Iran

Alikuh Persian: اليكوه
- Village
- Location within Iran
- Coordinates: 32°07′53″N 50°30′10″E
- Country: Iran
- Province: Chaharmahal and Bakhtiari
- County: Ardal
- District: Central
- Rural District: Poshtkuh

Population (2016)
  - Total: 2,206
- Time zone: UTC+3:30 (IRST)

Alikuh (Persian: اليكوه) (Note: Also romanized as Ālī Kūh and ‘Ālīkūh; also known as Ālkūh) is a village in Poshtkuh Rural District of the Central District in Ardal County, Chaharmahal and Bakhtiari province, Iran.

== Demographics ==
=== Ethnicity ===
The village is populated by Lurs.

=== Population ===
At the time of the 2006 National Census, the village's population was 2,382 in 473 households. The following census in 2011 counted 2,714 people in 716 households. The 2016 census measured the population of the village as 2,206 people in 628 households. It was the most populous village in its rural district.
