= Deh Gap-e Mahmudi =

Village in Fars province, Iran

Deh Gap-e Mahmudi Persian: ده گپ محمودي
- Village
- Location within Iran
- Coordinates: 30°01′57″N 51°52′35″E
- Country: Iran
- Province: Fars
- County: Mamasani
- District: Doshman Ziari
- Rural District: Doshman Ziari

Population (2016)
  - Total: 502
- Time zone: UTC+3:30 (IRST)

Deh Gap-e Mahmudi (Persian: ده گپ محمودي) (Note: Also romanized as Deh Gap-e Maḩmūdī; also known as Deh Gap and Deh-e Gap) is a village in Doshman Ziari Rural District of Doshman Ziari District, Mamasani County, Fars province, Iran.

== Demographics ==
=== Population ===
At the time of the 2006 National Census, the village's population was 609 in 167 households. The following census in 2011 counted 548 people in 169 households. The 2016 census measured the population of the village as 502 people in 153 households. It was the most populous village in its rural district.
