= Abshar =

Abshar (Persian: آبشار) is Persian word meaning Waterfall. It may refer to various locations with similar names:

- Abshar, Afghanistan
- Abshar, Iran
- Abshar Rural District, in Iran

== See also ==
- Absharan (disambiguation)
- Aabshar, a 1953 Indian film
- Aabshar-e-Ghazal, a 1985 studio album by Indian singers Asha Bhosle and Hariharan
