= Sar Rud =

Sar Rud (Persian: سررود) may refer to:

- Sar Rud, Fars
- Sar Rud, Kalat, Razavi Khorasan Province
- Sar Rud, Sabzevar, Razavi Khorasan Province
- Sar Rud, Sistan and Baluchestan
