= Sar Mur, Chaharmahal and Bakhtiari =

Village in Chaharmahal and Bakhtiari province, Iran

Sar Mur Persian: سرمور
- Village
- Location within Iran
- Coordinates: 31°57′32″N 50°31′41″E
- Country: Iran
- Province: Chaharmahal and Bakhtiari
- County: Ardal
- District: Central
- Rural District: Dinaran

Population (2016)
  - Total: 713
- Time zone: UTC+3:30 (IRST)

Sar Mur (Persian: سرمور) (Note: Also romanized as Sar Mūr) is a village in Dinaran Rural District of the Central District in Ardal County, Chaharmahal and Bakhtiari province, Iran.

== Demographics ==
=== Ethnicity ===
The village is populated by Lurs.

=== Population ===
At the time of the 2006 National Census, the village's population was 983 in 188 households. The following census in 2011 counted 823 people in 201 households. The 2016 census measured the population of the village as 713 people in 212 households.
