= Dashtak, Chaharmahal and Bakhtiari =

City in Chaharmahal and Bakhtiari province, Iran

Dashtak Persian: دشتک
- City
- Location within Iran
- Coordinates: 32°09′44″N 50°27′06″E
- Country: Iran
- Province: Chaharmahal and Bakhtiari
- County: Ardal
- District: Central
- Established as a city: 2013

Population (2016)
  - Total: 4,016
- Time zone: UTC+3:30 (IRST)

Dashtak (Persian: دشتک) is a city in the Central District of Ardal County, Chaharmahal and Bakhtiari province, Iran.

== Demographics ==
=== Ethnicity ===
The city is populated by Lurs.

=== Population ===
At the time of the 2006 National Census, Dashtak's population was 4,142 in 898 households, when it was a village in Poshtkuh Rural District. The following census in 2011 counted 4,348 people in 1,092 households. The 2016 census measured the population as 4,016 people in 1,110 households, by which time Dashtak had been converted to a city.
