= Qalatak, Fars =

Village in Fars province, Iran

Qalatak قلاتك
- Village
- Location within Iran
- Coordinates: 29°58′21″N 51°47′04″E
- Country: Iran
- Province: Fars
- County: Mamasani
- Bakhsh: Doshman Ziari
- Rural District: Mashayekh

Population (2016)
  - Total: 359
- Time zone: UTC+3:30 (IRST)
  - Summer (DST): UTC+4:30 (IRDT)

Qalatak (Persian: قلاتك, also Romanized as Qalātak; also known as Rūbanī) is a village in Mashayekh Rural District, in the Doshman Ziari District of Mamasani County, Fars province, Iran. It is situated in the Zagros foothills in the southwestern part of Fars province. The village lies within the traditional territory of the Doshman Ziari, one of the four sub-tribes of the Mamasani tribal confederacy, a Luri people who speak a dialect of Southern Luri.

== Demographics ==
At the time of the 2006 National Census, the village's population was 349, in 88 households. The following census in 2011 counted 345 people in 90 households. The 2016 census measured the population of the village as 359 people in 99 households. The village's population has remained relatively stable across the three census periods, in contrast to the broader Mashayekh Rural District, which declined from 5,252 inhabitants in 2006 to 4,784 in 2016.
