= Dastgerd District =

District in Chaharmahal and Bakhtiari province, Iran

Dastgerd District Persian: بخش دستگرد
- District
- Location within Iran
- Coordinates: 32°06′N 51°02′E
- Country: Iran
- Province: Chaharmahal and Bakhtiari
- County: Farrokhshahr
- Established: 2023
- Capital: Dastgerd-e Emamzadeh
- Time zone: UTC+3:30 (IRST)

Dastgerd District (Persian: بخش دستگرد) is in Farrokhshahr County of Chaharmahal and Bakhtiari province, Iran. Its capital is the village of Dastgerd-e Emamzadeh, whose population at the time of the 2016 National Census was 2,810 people in 871 households.

== History ==
In 2013, the city of Farrokh Shahr was separated from the Central District of Shahrekord County, and Dastgerd Rural District from Kiar County, in the formation of Farrokhshahr District.

In 2023, the district was separated from the county in the establishment of Farrokhshahr County, which was divided into two districts and three rural districts, with Farrokh Shahr as its capital and only city at the time.

== Demographics ==
=== Administrative divisions ===
Dastgerd District
Administrative Divisions
Dastgerd RD
Surk RD
RD = Rural District
