= Shahrak-e 12 Emam =

Village in Chaharmahal and Bakhtiari province, Iran

Shahrak-e 12 Emam Persian: شهرك 12امام
- Village
- Location within Iran
- Coordinates: 31°59′56″N 50°32′51″E
- Country: Iran
- Province: Chaharmahal and Bakhtiari
- County: Ardal
- District: Central
- Rural District: Poshtkuh

Population (2016)
  - Total: 1,448
- Time zone: UTC+3:30 (IRST)

Shahrak-e 12 Emam (Persian: شهرك 12امام) (Note: Also romanized as Shahrak-e 12 Emām) is a village in Poshtkuh Rural District of the Central District in Ardal County, Chaharmahal and Bakhtiari province, Iran.

== Demographics ==
=== Ethnicity ===
The village is populated by Lurs.

=== Population ===
At the time of the 2006 National Census, the village's population was 1,529 in 331 households. The following census in 2011 counted 1,694 people in 407 households. The 2016 census measured the population of the village as 1,448 people in 386 households.
