= Kaj, Chaharmahal and Bakhtiari =

City in Chaharmahal and Bakhtiari province, Iran

Kaj Persian: كاج
- City
- Location within Iran
- Coordinates: 32°03′29″N 50°34′56″E
- Country: Iran
- Province: Chaharmahal and Bakhtiari
- County: Ardal
- District: Central
- Established as a city: 2013

Population (2016)
  - Total: 4,227
- Time zone: UTC+3:30 (IRST)

Kaj (Persian: كاج) (Note: Also romanized as Kāj; also known as Gāch Kaj and Qāch Kaj) is a city in the Central District of Ardal County, Chaharmahal and Bakhtiari province, Iran.

== Demographics ==
=== Ethnicity ===
The city is populated by Lurs.

=== Population ===
At the time of the 2006 National Census, Kaj's population was 3,774 in 800 households, when it was a village in Poshtkuh Rural District. The following census in 2011 counted 4,027 people in 982 households. The 2016 census measured the population as 4,227 people in 1,167 households, by which time Kaj had been converted to a city.
