= Maaden =

Maaden or Ma'aden may refer to:

- Madan, Chaharmahal and Bakhtiari, or Ma'aden, a village in Iran
- Maaden El-Irvane, or Maaden, a rural commune in Mauritania
- Maaden (company), the Saudi state-owned mining company

== See also ==
- Goldi SC, formerly El-Maaden, an Egyptian football club
- Museum of African Contemporary Art Al Maaden, an art museum in Morocco
- Madan (disambiguation)
