= Berenjgan =

Berenjgan or Berenjegan (Persian: برنجگان) may refer to:

- Berenjgan, Chaharmahal and Bakhtiari
- Berenjegan, Isfahan
