= Mamasani =

Mamasani may refer to:

- Mamasani County, an administrative subdivision of Iran
- Mamasani, a Luri tribe
- Mamasani, Chaharmahal and Bakhtiari, a village in Iran
