= Aqajan-e Tavakkol =

Aqajan-e Tavakkol اقاجان توكل
- Village
- Location within Iran
- Coordinates: 29°56′57″N 52°01′36″E
- Country: Iran
- Province: Fars
- County: Mamasani
- Bakhsh: Doshman Ziari
- Rural District: Doshman Ziari

Population (2006)
  - Total: 42
- Time zone: UTC+3:30 (IRST)
  - Summer (DST): UTC+4:30 (IRDT)

Aqajan-e Tavakkol (Persian: اقاجان توكل, also Romanized as Āqājān-e Tavakkol; also known as Āqājān-e Tavakkolī) is a village in Doshman Ziari Rural District, Doshman Ziari District, Mamasani County, Fars province, Iran. At the 2006 census, its population was 42, in 8 families.
