= Dowlatabad, Mamasani =

Village in Fars province, Iran

Dowlatabad Persian: دولت آباد
- Village
- Location within Iran
- Coordinates: 30°01′07″N 51°57′35″E
- Country: Iran
- Province: Fars
- County: Mamasani
- District: Doshman Ziari
- Rural District: Doshman Ziari

Population (2016)
  - Total: 271
- Time zone: UTC+3:30 (IRST)

Dowlatabad (Persian: دولت آباد) (Note: Formerly Boneh Darvazeh (بنه دروازه), also romanized as Boneh Darvāzeh; also known as Bandarvāzeh) is a village in Doshman Ziari Rural District of Doshman Ziari District, Mamasani County, Fars province, Iran, serving as capital of both the district and the rural district.

== Demographics ==
=== Population ===
At the time of the 2006 National Census, the village's population was 428 in 94 households. The following census in 2011 counted 554 people in 91 households. The 2016 census measured the population of the village as 271 people in 75 households.
