= Gahru =

City in Chaharmahal and Bakhtiari province, Iran

Gahru Persian: گهرو
- City
- Location within Iran
- Coordinates: 32°00′12″N 50°53′11″E
- Country: Iran
- Province: Chaharmahal and Bakhtiari
- County: Kiar
- District: Central
- Established as a city: 1999

Population (2016)
  - Total: 6,263
- Time zone: UTC+3:30 (IRST)

Gahru (Persian: گهرو) (Note: Also romanized as Gahroū; also known as Kahroū) is a city in the Central District of Kiar County, Chaharmahal and Bakhtiari province, Iran. The village of Gahru was converted to a city in 1999.

== Demographics ==
=== Ethnicity ===
The village is populated by Lurs.

=== Population ===
At the time of the 2006 National Census, the city's population was 6,093 in 1,464 households, when it was in the former Kiar District of Shahrekord County. The following census in 2011 counted 5,949 people in 1,684 households, by which time the district had been separated from the county in the establishment of Kiar County. Gahru was transferred to the new Central District. The 2016 census measured the population of the city as 6,263 people in 1,894 households.
