= Durak (surname) =

Durak is a Turkish and Slovak surname. Notable people with the surname include:

- Abdullah Durak (born 1987), Turkish footballer
- Aytaç Durak (born 1938), Turkish politician
- Miroslav Durak, Slovak ice hockey player
- Mustafa Durak (born 1988), French footballer
- Nûdem Durak, Turkish Kurdish singer, folk musician and political prisoner

== See also ==
- Durack (disambiguation)
