= Mashayekh, Mamasani =

Village in Fars province, Iran

Mashayekh Persian: مشايخ
- Village
- Location within Iran
- Coordinates: 29°55′14″N 51°54′48″E
- Country: Iran
- Province: Fars
- County: Mamasani
- District: Doshman Ziari
- Rural District: Mashayekh

Population (2016)
  - Total: 524
- Time zone: UTC+3:30 (IRST)

Mashayekh (Persian: مشايخ) (Note: Also romanized as Mashāyekh) is a village in, and the capital of, Mashayekh Rural District of Doshman Ziari District, Mamasani County, Fars province, Iran.

== Demographics ==
=== Population ===
At the time of the 2006 National Census, the village's population was 559 in 138 households. The following census in 2011 counted 493 people in 146 households. The 2016 census measured the population of the village as 524 people in 169 households.
