= Shahrak-e Mamasani =

Village in Chaharmahal and Bakhtiari province, Iran

Shahrak-e Mamasani Persian: شهرك ممسني
- Village
- Location within Iran
- Coordinates: 31°57′35″N 50°30′52″E
- Country: Iran
- Province: Chaharmahal and Bakhtiari
- County: Ardal
- District: Central
- Rural District: Dinaran

Population (2016)
  - Total: 924
- Time zone: UTC+3:30 (IRST)

Shahrak-e Mamasani (Persian: شهرك ممسني) (Note: Also romanized as Shahrak-e Mamasanī; also known as Mamasanī, Mamasanī ‘Olyā, and Mamasanī-ye Bāla) is a village in Dinaran Rural District of the Central District in Ardal County, Chaharmahal and Bakhtiari province, Iran.

== Demographics ==
=== Ethnicity ===
The village is populated by Lurs.

=== Population ===
At the time of the 2006 National Census, the village's population was 1,137 in 195 households. The following census in 2011 counted 910 people in 225 households. The 2016 census measured the population of the village as 924 people in 229 households.
