= Durak Zenan =

Durak Zenan (Persian: دورك زنان) may refer to:

- Durak Zenan-e Olya
- Durak Zenan-e Sofla
