= Kiar-e Sharqi District =

District in Chaharmahal and Bakhtiari province, Iran

Kiar-e Sharqi District Persian: بخش کیار شرقی
- District
- Location within Iran
- Coordinates: 32°07′N 50°55′E
- Country: Iran
- Province: Chaharmahal and Bakhtiari
- County: Kiar
- Established: 2023
- Capital: Dezak
- Time zone: UTC+3:30 (IRST)

Kiar-e Sharqi District (Persian: بخش کیار شرقی) is in Kiar County, Chaharmahal and Bakhtiari province, Iran. Its capital is the village of Dezak, whose population at the time of the 2016 National Census was 2,942 people in 881 households.

== History ==
In 2007, Kiar District of Shahrekord County, and Mashayekh and Naghan Rural Districts, and the city of Naghan, were separated from Ardal County in the establishment of Kiar County.

In 2023, Kiar-e Sharqi Rural District was separated from the Central District in the formation of Kiar-e Sharqi District.

== Demographics ==
=== Administrative divisions ===
Kiar-e Sharqi District
Administrative Divisions
Kiar-e Bala RD
Kiar-e Sharqi RD (Note: Formerly Dastgerd Rural District)
RD = Rural District
