= Tavakkoli (surname) =

Tavakkoli or Tavakoli (Persian: توکلی) is a Persian surname. Notable people with the surname include:

° Ahmadreza Tavakoli (1978) Persia Global CEO

- Ahmad Tavakkoli (1951–2025), Iranian politician, journalist and anti-corruption activist
- Bahram Tavakkoli (water polo) (born 1953), Iranian water polo player
- Bahram Tavakoli (film director) (born 1976), Iranian film director and screenwriter
- Farhad Tavakoli (born 1989), Iranian futsal player
- Jahangir Tavakkoli
- Hangi Tavakoli (born 1990), Iranian musician and record producer
- Hossein Tavakkoli (born 1978), Iranian weightlifter
- Majid Tavakoli (born 1986), Iranian student leader, human rights activist and political prisoner
- Mercedes Tavakoli
- Mohamad Tavakoli-Targhi (born 1957), Iranian-born Canadian scholar, editor, author, professor

== See also ==
- Tavakkoli Dede (died 1625), Bosnian poet from Sarajevo
- Tawakkul
