= Durack =

Durack may refer to:

== People ==
=== Western Australian pioneer family ===
- Patrick Durack (1834–1898), pastoralist
- Michael Durack (1865–1950), pastoralist, son of Patrick
- Mary Durack (1913–1994), historian, daughter of Michael
- Elizabeth Durack (1915–2000), artist and writer, daughter of Michael
- J. P. Durack (1888–1978), Australian lawyer also known as Roaring Jack Durack or Black Jack Durack
- Peter Durack QC (1926-2008), Rhodes Scholar, lawyer. politician

=== Other people of that name ===
- Ernest Durack (1882–1967), politician
- Fanny Durack (1889–1956), swimmer
- Lizzie Durack, footballer
- Lucy Durack (born 1982), performer
- Ray Durack, hurler
- Séamus Durack, hurler

== Places ==
- Durack River
- Durack, Northern Territory
- Durack, Queensland

== Other ==
- Division of Durack, an electoral division in the state of Western Australia

== See also ==
- Durak (disambiguation)
