= Chal-e Balutak =

Chal-e Balutak چال بلوطك
- Village
- Location within Iran
- Coordinates: 32°07′33″N 49°32′05″E
- Country: Iran
- Province: Khuzestan
- County: Andika
- Bakhsh: Abezhdan
- Rural District: Kushk

Population (2006)
  - Total: 103
- Time zone: UTC+3:30 (IRST)
  - Summer (DST): UTC+4:30 (IRDT)

Chal-e Balutak (Persian: چال بلوطك, also Romanized as Chāl-e Balūṭaḵ) is a village in Kushk Rural District, Abezhdan District, Andika County, Khuzestan Province, Iran. At the 2006 census, its population was 103, in 18 families.
