= Chahar Taq, Jahrom =

Chahar Taq چهارطاق
- Village
- Location within Iran
- Coordinates: 28°42′32″N 53°08′30″E
- Country: Iran
- Province: Fars
- County: Jahrom
- Bakhsh: Simakan
- Rural District: Posht Par

Population (2006)
  - Total: 223
- Time zone: UTC+3:30 (IRST)
  - Summer (DST): UTC+4:30 (IRDT)

Chahar Taq (Persian: چهارطاق, also Romanized as Chahār Ţāq) is a village in Posht Par Rural District, Simakan District, Jahrom County, Fars province, Iran. At the 2006 census, its population was 223, in 54 families.
