= Chahar Taq, Kazerun =

Chahar Taq چهارطاق
- Village
- Location within Iran
- Coordinates: 29°17′52″N 51°58′04″E
- Country: Iran
- Province: Fars
- County: Kazerun
- Bakhsh: Jereh and Baladeh
- Rural District: Jereh

Population (2006)
  - Total: 94
- Time zone: UTC+3:30 (IRST)
  - Summer (DST): UTC+4:30 (IRDT)

Chahar Taq (Persian: چهارطاق, also Romanized as Chahār Ţāq and Chahārţāq) is a village in Jereh Rural District, Jereh and Baladeh District, Kazerun County, Fars province, Iran. At the 2006 census, its population was 94, in 16 families.
