= Durak, Susan-e Gharbi =

Durak دورك
- Village
- Location within Iran
- Coordinates: 32°06′44″N 49°47′50″E
- Country: Iran
- Province: Khuzestan
- County: Izeh
- Bakhsh: Susan
- Rural District: Susan-e Gharbi

Population (2006)
  - Total: 267
- Time zone: UTC+3:30 (IRST)
  - Summer (DST): UTC+4:30 (IRDT)

Durak (Persian: دورك, also Romanized as Dūrak) is a village in Susan-e Gharbi Rural District, Susan District, Izeh County, Khuzestan Province, Iran. In the 2006 census, its population was 267 people across 47 families.
