= Durak, Chaharmahal and Bakhtiari =

Durak دورك
- Village
- Location within Iran
- Coordinates: 31°12′06″N 51°02′16″E
- Country: Iran
- Province: Chaharmahal and Bakhtiari
- County: Lordegan
- Bakhsh: Central
- Rural District: Sardasht

Population (2006)
  - Total: 43
- Time zone: UTC+3:30 (IRST)
  - Summer (DST): UTC+4:30 (IRDT)

Durak (Persian: دورك, also romanized as Dūrak; also known as Dowraj, Dūrak-e Fāj, and Dūrak-e Ghāch) is a village in Sardasht Rural District, in the Central District of Lordegan County, Chaharmahal and Bakhtiari Province, Iran. At the 2006 census its population was 43, in 8 families. The village is populated by Lurs.
