= Durak-e Olya =

Durak-e Olya دورك عليا
- Village
- Location within Iran
- Coordinates: 32°16′02″N 50°02′25″E
- Country: Iran
- Province: Chaharmahal and Bakhtiari
- County: Kuhrang
- Bakhsh: Bazoft
- Rural District: Bazoft

Population (2006)
  - Total: 315
- Time zone: UTC+3:30 (IRST)
  - Summer (DST): UTC+4:30 (IRDT)

Durak-e Olya (Persian: دورك عليا, also Romanized as Dūrak-e ‘Olyā and Dowrak-e ‘Olyā) is a village in Bazoft Rural District, Bazoft District, Kuhrang County, Chaharmahal and Bakhtiari Province, Iran. At the 2006 census, its population was 315, in 44 families. The village is populated by Lurs.
