= Sheykhlar, East Azerbaijan =

Sheykhlar شيخلر
- Village
- Location within Iran
- Coordinates: 37°17′48″N 48°10′11″E
- Country: Iran
- Province: East Azerbaijan
- County: Meyaneh
- Bakhsh: Kaghazkonan
- Rural District: Kaghazkonan-e Markazi

Population (2006)
  - Total: 102
- Time zone: UTC+3:30 (IRST)
  - Summer (DST): UTC+4:30 (IRDT)

Sheykhlar (Persian: شيخلر; also known as Ishihlar, Ishikhlar, Mashāyekh) is a village in Kaghazkonan-e Markazi Rural District, Kaghazkonan District, Meyaneh County, East Azerbaijan Province, Iran. At the 2006 census, its population was 102, in 36 families.
