= Aqajan, East Azerbaijan =

Aqajan اقاجان
- Village
- Location within Iran
- Coordinates: 37°42′49″N 46°50′17″E
- Country: Iran
- Province: East Azerbaijan
- County: Bostanabad
- Bakhsh: Tekmeh Dash
- Rural District: Ujan-e Sharqi

Population (2006)
  - Total: 165
- Time zone: UTC+3:30 (IRST)
  - Summer (DST): UTC+4:30 (IRDT)

Aqajan (Persian: اقاجان, also Romanized as Āqājān; also known as Ātājān) is a village in Ujan-e Sharqi Rural District, Tekmeh Dash District, Bostanabad County, East Azerbaijan Province, Iran. At the 2006 census, its population was 165, in 38 families.
