= Chahar Taq, Hamadan =

Chahar Taq چهارطاق
- Village
- Location within Iran
- Coordinates: 35°30′56″N 48°25′24″E
- Country: Iran
- Province: Hamadan
- County: Kabudarahang
- Bakhsh: Shirin Su
- Rural District: Shirin Su

Population (2006)
  - Total: 245
- Time zone: UTC+3:30 (IRST)
  - Summer (DST): UTC+4:30 (IRDT)

Chahar Taq (Persian: چهارطاق, also Romanized as Chahār Ţāq; also known as Chahar Tagh and Chehār Tākh) is a village in Shirin Su Rural District, Shirin Su District, Kabudarahang County, Hamadan Province, Iran. At the 2006 census, its population was 245, in 45 families.
