= Tavakkol-e Karim Kola =

Tavakkol-e Karim Kola توكل كريم كلا
- Village
- Location within Iran
- Coordinates: 36°34′33″N 52°33′33″E
- Country: Iran
- Province: Mazandaran
- County: Babol
- Bakhsh: Lalehabad
- Rural District: Karipey

Population (2006)
  - Total: 98
- Time zone: UTC+3:30 (IRST)
  - Summer (DST): UTC+4:30 (IRDT)

Tavakkol-e Karim Kola (Persian: توكل كريم كلا, also Romanized as Tavakkol-e Karīm Kolā; also known as Tavakkol) is a village in Karipey Rural District, Lalehabad District, Babol County, Mazandaran Province, Iran. At the 2006 census, its population was 98, in 21 families.
