= Durak Rahman =

Durak Rahman دورك رحمان
- Village
- Location within Iran
- Coordinates: 31°45′47″N 50°22′29″E
- Country: Iran
- Province: Chaharmahal and Bakhtiari
- County: Ardal
- Bakhsh: Miankuh
- Rural District: Shalil

Population (2006)
  - Total: 112
- Time zone: UTC+3:30 (IRST)
  - Summer (DST): UTC+4:30 (IRDT)

Durak Rahman (Persian: دورك رحمان, also romanized as Dūrak Raḩmān) is a village in Shalil Rural District, Miankuh District, Ardal County, Chaharmahal and Bakhtiari Province, Iran. At the 2006 census its population was 112, in 17 families.
