= Abshar, Afghanistan =

Abshar
- Location in Afghanistan
- Coordinates: 35°11′36″N 63°1′28″E
- Country: Afghanistan
- Province: Badghis Province
- Time zone: + 4.30

Abshar is a village in Badghis Province in North Western Afghanistan.
