= Durak-e Sofla =

Durak-e Sofla دورك سفلي
- Village
- Location within Iran
- Coordinates: 32°15′14″N 50°01′51″E
- Country: Iran
- Province: Chaharmahal and Bakhtiari
- County: Kuhrang
- Bakhsh: Bazoft
- Rural District: Bazoft

Population (2006)
  - Total: 208
- Time zone: UTC+3:30 (IRST)
  - Summer (DST): UTC+4:30 (IRDT)

Durak-e Sofla (Persian: دورك سفلي, also Romanized as Dūrak-e Soflá and Dowrak-e Soflá) is a village in Bazoft Rural District, Bazoft District, Kuhrang County, Chaharmahal and Bakhtiari Province, Iran. At the 2006 census, its population was 208, in 35 families. The village is populated by Lurs.
