= Chahar Taq, Marvdasht =

Chahar Taq چهارطاق
- Village
- Location within Iran
- Coordinates: 29°48′51″N 53°01′54″E
- Country: Iran
- Province: Fars
- County: Marvdasht
- Bakhsh: Central
- Rural District: Mohammadabad

Population (2006)
  - Total: 662
- Time zone: UTC+3:30 (IRST)
  - Summer (DST): UTC+4:30 (IRDT)

Chahar Taq (Persian: چهارطاق, also Romanized as Chahār Ţāq; also known as Chatak and Shamsābād-e Chahār Ţāq) is a village in Mohammadabad Rural District, in the Central District of Marvdasht County, Fars province, Iran. At the 2006 census, its population was 662, in 149 families.
