= Chahar Taq, Bardsir =

Chahar Taq چهارطاق
- Village
- Location within Iran
- Coordinates: 29°30′26″N 57°08′00″E
- Country: Iran
- Province: Kerman
- County: Bardsir
- Bakhsh: Central
- Rural District: Golzar

Population (2006)
  - Total: 369
- Time zone: UTC+3:30 (IRST)
  - Summer (DST): UTC+4:30 (IRDT)

Chahar Taq (Persian: چهارطاق, also romanized as Chahār Ţāq and Chehār Taq; also known as Chahār Vāg and Chehār) is a village in Golzar Rural District, in the Central District of Bardsir County, Kerman Province, Iran. At the 2006 census, its population was 369, in 79 families.
