= Durak, Zaz and Mahru =

Durak دورك
- Village
- Location within Iran
- Coordinates: 33°10′15″N 48°53′46″E
- Country: Iran
- Province: Lorestan
- County: Aligudarz
- Bakhsh: Zaz and Mahru
- Rural District: Mahru

Population (2006)
  - Total: 31
- Time zone: UTC+3:30 (IRST)
  - Summer (DST): UTC+4:30 (IRDT)

Durak (Persian: دورك, also Romanized as Dūrak) is a village in Mahru Rural District, Zaz and Mahru District, Aligudarz County, Lorestan Province, Iran. At the 2006 census, its population was 31, in 6 families.
