= Bajgiran, Markazi =

Bajgiran باجگيران
- Village
- Location within Iran
- Coordinates: 33°39′53″N 49°20′32″E
- Country: Iran
- Province: Markazi
- County: Shazand
- Bakhsh: Sarband
- Rural District: Hendudar

Population (2006)
  - Total: 97
- Time zone: UTC+3:30 (IRST)
  - Summer (DST): UTC+4:30 (IRDT)

Bajgiran (Persian: باجگيران, also Romanized as Bājgīrān; also known as Bājkīrān) is a village in Hendudar Rural District, Sarband District, Shazand County, Markazi Province, Iran. At the 2006 census, its population was 97, in 28 families.
