= Dam Ab, Bagh-e Malek =

Dam Ab دم اب
- Village
- Location within Iran
- Coordinates: 31°29′44″N 49°54′19″E
- Country: Iran
- Province: Khuzestan
- County: Bagh-e Malek
- Bakhsh: Central
- Rural District: Haparu

Population (2006)
  - Total: 596
- Time zone: UTC+3:30 (IRST)
  - Summer (DST): UTC+4:30 (IRDT)

Dam Ab (Persian: دم اب, also Romanized as Dam Āb and Dam-e Āb) is a village in Haparu Rural District, in the Central District of Bagh-e Malek County, Khuzestan Province, Iran. At the 2006 census, its population was 596, in 111 families.
