= Shalamzar =

City in Chaharmahal and Bakhtiari province, Iran

Shalamazar Persian: شلمزار
- City
- Location within Iran
- Coordinates: 32°02′45″N 50°49′05″E
- Country: Iran
- Province: Chaharmahal and Bakhtiari
- County: Kiar
- District: Central

Population (2016)
  - Total: 6,899
- Time zone: UTC+3:30 (IRST)

Shalamzar (Persian: شلمزار) (Note: Also romanized as Shalamzār) is a city in the Central District of Kiar County, Chaharmahal and Bakhtiari province, Iran, serving as capital of both the county and the district. It is also the administrative center for Kiar-e Gharbi Rural District. (Note: Formerly Shalamzar Rural District)

== Demographics ==
=== Ethnicity ===
The city is populated by Lurs.

=== Population ===
At the time of the 2006 National Census, the city's population was 7,003 in 1,671 households, when it was capital of the former Kiar District of Shahrekord County. The following census in 2011 counted 7,132 people in 1,965 households, by which time the district had been separated from the county in the establishment of Kiar County. Shalamzar was transferred to the new Central District. The 2016 census measured the population of the city as 6,899 people in 2,116 households.

== Climate ==
Climate data for Shalamzar (elevation: 2041m, 1994-2012 precipitation normals)
| Month | Jan | Feb | Mar | Apr | May | Jun | Jul | Aug | Sep | Oct | Nov | Dec | Year |
|---|---|---|---|---|---|---|---|---|---|---|---|---|---|
| Average precipitation mm (inches) | 100.0 (3.94) | 94.3 (3.71) | 101.3 (3.99) | 68.6 (2.70) | 13.0 (0.51) | 0.8 (0.03) | 1.0 (0.04) | 0.1 (0.00) | 0.8 (0.03) | 6.6 (0.26) | 80.7 (3.18) | 101.8 (4.01) | 569 (22.4) |
Source: Chaharmahalmet
