= Tavakkol, Hirmand =

Tavakkol توكل
- Village
- Location within Iran
- Coordinates: 31°06′21″N 61°42′15″E
- Country: Iran
- Province: Sistan and Baluchestan
- County: Hirmand
- Bakhsh: Central
- Rural District: Margan

Population (2006)
  - Total: 90
- Time zone: UTC+3:30 (IRST)
  - Summer (DST): UTC+4:30 (IRDT)

Tavakkol (Persian: توكل, also Romanized as Tavakol; also known as Tavakol Bārānī) is a village in Margan Rural District, in the Central District of Hirmand County, Sistan and Baluchestan Province, Iran. At the 2006 census, its population was 90, represented by 19 families.
