= Durak Zenan-e Olya =

Durak Zenan-e Olya دورك زنان عليا
- Village
- Country: Iran
- Province: Khuzestan
- County: Izeh
- Bakhsh: Central
- Rural District: Holayjan

Population (2006)
  - Total: 273
- Time zone: UTC+3:30 (IRST)
  - Summer (DST): UTC+4:30 (IRDT)

Durak Zenan-e Olya (Persian: دورك زنان عليا, also Romanized as Dūrak Zenān-e ‘Olyā) is a village in Holayjan Rural District, in the Central District of Izeh County, Khuzestan Province, Iran. At the 2006 census, its population was 273, in 46 families.
