= Dinaran Rural District =

Rural district in Chaharmahal and Bakhtiari province, Iran

Dinaran Rural District Persian: دهستان ديناران
- Rural District
- Location within Iran
- Coordinates: 31°59′N 50°21′E
- Country: Iran
- Province: Chaharmahal and Bakhtiari
- County: Ardal
- District: Central
- Established: 1987
- Capital: Lir Abi

Population (2016)
  - Total: 5,890
- Time zone: UTC+3:30 (IRST)

Dinaran Rural District (Persian: دهستان ديناران) is in the Central District of Ardal County, Chaharmahal and Bakhtiari province, Iran. Its capital is the village of Lir Abi.

== Demographics ==
=== Population ===
At the time of the 2006 National Census, the rural district's population was 7,548 in 1,394 households. There were 6,800 inhabitants in 1,461 households at the following census of 2011. The 2016 census measured the population of the rural district as 5,890 in 1,432 households. The most populous of its 37 villages was Lir Abi, with 1,189 people.

=== Other villages in the rural district ===
- Sar Mur
- Shahrak-e Mamasani
