= Qaleh Tak, Kuhrang =

Village in Chaharmahal and Bakhtiari, Iran

Qaleh Tak قلعه تك
- Village
- Location within Iran
- Coordinates: 32°29′50″N 50°08′05″E
- Country: Iran
- Province: Chaharmahal and Bakhtiari
- County: Kuhrang
- Bakhsh: Central
- Rural District: Shurab-e Tangazi

Population (2006)
  - Total: 111
- Time zone: UTC+3:30 (IRST)
  - Summer (DST): UTC+4:30 (IRDT)

Qaleh Tak (Persian: قلعه تك, also Romanized as Qal‘eh Tak; also known as Ghal‘eh Tak and Qalātak) is a village in Shurab-e Tangazi Rural District, in the Central District of Kuhrang County, Chaharmahal and Bakhtiari Province, Iran. At the 2006 census, its population was 111, in 21 families. The village is populated by Lurs.
