= Kiar-e Gharbi Rural District =

Rural district in Chaharmahal and Bakhtiari province, Iran

Kiar-e Gharbi Rural District Persian: دهستان کیار غربی
- Rural District
- Location within Iran
- Coordinates: 32°03′N 50°49′E
- Country: Iran
- Province: Chaharmahal and Bakhtiari
- County: Kiar
- District: Central
- Capital: Shalamzar

Population (2016)
  - Total: 9,011
- Time zone: UTC+3:30 (IRST)

Kiar-e Gharbi Rural District (Persian: دهستان کیار غربی) (Note: Formerly Shalamzar Rural District (دهستان شلمزار)) is in the Central District of Kiar County, Chaharmahal and Bakhtiari province, Iran. It is administered from the city of Shalamzar.

== Demographics ==
=== Population ===
At the time of the 2006 National Census, the rural district's population (as a part of the former Kiar District in Shahrekord County) was 15,352 in 3,898 households. There were 9,814 inhabitants in 2,979 households at the following census of 2011, by which time the district had been separated from the county in the establishment of Kiar County. The rural district was transferred to the new Central District. The 2016 census measured the population of the rural district as 9,011 in 2,893 households. The most populous of its 12 villages was Kharaji (now in Kharaji Rural District), with 2,880 people.

=== Other villages in the rural district ===
- Hajjiabad
- Jafarabad
- Qaleh-ye Mamka
- Salm
