= Tavakkoli Dede =

Bosnian poet

Tavakkoli Dede, also known as Tavakkoli-dede Sarayli (died 1625), was a Bosnian poet from Sarajevo. He wrote in Persian, although his works are no longer extant. It appears he got adept in Persian through his affiliation with the Mevlevi Order.
