= Poshtkuh Rural District (Ardal County) =

Rural district in Chaharmahal and Bakhtiari province, Iran

Poshtkuh Rural District Persian: دهستان پشتكوه
- Rural District
- Location within Iran
- Coordinates: 32°05′N 50°34′E
- Country: Iran
- Province: Chaharmahal and Bakhtiari
- County: Ardal
- District: Central
- Established: 1987
- Capital: Rostamabad

Population (2016)
  - Total: 10,933
- Time zone: UTC+3:30 (IRST)

Poshtkuh Rural District (Persian: دهستان پشتكوه) is in the Central District of Ardal County, Chaharmahal and Bakhtiari province, Iran. Its capital is the village of Rostamabad.

== Demographics ==
=== Population ===
At the time of the 2006 National Census, the rural district's population was 20,878 in 4,468 households. There were 21,395 inhabitants in 5,442 households at the following census of 2011. The 2016 census measured the population of the rural district as 10,933 in 3,083 households. The most populous of its 24 villages was Alikuh, with 2,206 people.

=== Other villages in the rural district ===
- Deh Kohneh-ye Rugar
- Sar Chah
- Shahrak-e 12 Emam
