= Mashayekh Rural District (Mamasani County) =

Rural district in Fars province, Iran

Mashayekh Rural District Persian: دهستان مشايخ
- Rural District
- Location within Iran
- Coordinates: 29°55′25″N 51°51′08″E
- Country: Iran
- Province: Fars
- County: Mamasani
- District: Doshman Ziari
- Capital: Mashayekh

Population (2016)
  - Total: 4,784
- Time zone: UTC+3:30 (IRST)

Mashayekh Rural District (Persian: دهستان مشايخ) is in Doshman Ziari District of Mamasani County, Fars province, Iran. Its capital is the village of Mashayekh.

== Demographics ==
=== Population ===
At the time of the 2006 National Census, the rural district's population was 5,252 in 1,272 households. There were 4,623 inhabitants in 1,331 households at the following census of 2011. The 2016 census measured the population of the rural district as 4,784 in 1,538 households. The most populous of its 33 villages was Dasht-e Azadegan, with 1,148 people.
