= Farrokh Shahr =

City in Chaharmahal and Bakhtiari province, Iran

Farrokh Shahr Persian: فرخ شهر
- City
- Location within Iran
- Coordinates: 32°16′24″N 50°58′48″E
- Country: Iran
- Province: Chaharmahal and Bakhtiari
- County: Farrokhshahr
- District: Central

Population (2016)
  - Total: 31,739
- Time zone: UTC+3:30 (IRST)

Farrokh Shahr (Persian: فرخ شهر) (Note: Formerly Ghahfarokh, Ghahfarrokh, Qahfarokh, and Qahfarrokh) is a city in the Central District of Farrokhshahr County, Chaharmahal and Bakhtiari province, Iran, serving as capital of both the county and the district. The city is 12 kilometres (7.5 mi) from the provincial capital, Shahrekord.

== Demographics ==
=== Ethnicity ===
The city is populated by Persians, with a Luri minority.

=== Population ===
At the time of the 2006 National Census, the city's population was 28,920 in 7,532 households, when it was in the Central District of Shahrekord County. The following census in 2011 counted 30,036 people in 8,266 households. The 2016 census measured the population of the city as 31,739 people in 9,292 households, by which time it had been separated from the district in the formation of Farrokhshahr District.

In 2023, the district was separated from the county in the establishment of Farrokhshahr County, and Farrokh Shahr was transferred to the new Central District as the county's capital.

== Climate ==
Climate data for Farrokh Shahr (1998-2013 normals and extremes)
| Month | Jan | Feb | Mar | Apr | May | Jun | Jul | Aug | Sep | Oct | Nov | Dec | Year |
|---|---|---|---|---|---|---|---|---|---|---|---|---|---|
| Record high °C (°F) | 16 (61) | 18 (64) | 24 (75) | 27 (81) | 31 (88) | 36 (97) | 39 (102) | 38 (100) | 33 (91) | 30 (86) | 23 (73) | 21 (70) | 39 (102) |
| Mean daily maximum °C (°F) | 6 (43) | 9 (48) | 14 (57) | 19 (66) | 25 (77) | 31 (88) | 33 (91) | 33 (91) | 29 (84) | 23 (73) | 14 (57) | 9 (48) | 20 (69) |
| Daily mean °C (°F) | −1 (30) | 3 (37) | 7 (45) | 11 (52) | 16 (61) | 21 (70) | 24 (75) | 23 (73) | 19 (66) | 14 (57) | 7 (45) | 2 (36) | 12 (54) |
| Mean daily minimum °C (°F) | −7 (19) | −4 (25) | −1 (30) | 4 (39) | 7 (45) | 11 (52) | 14 (57) | 13 (55) | 9 (48) | 4 (39) | 0 (32) | −4 (25) | 4 (39) |
| Record low °C (°F) | −27.8 (−18.0) | −17 (1) | −13 (9) | −5 (23) | 0 (32) | 5 (41) | 8 (46) | 8 (46) | 3 (37) | −3 (27) | −10 (14) | −26 (−15) | −27.8 (−18.0) |
| Average precipitation mm (inches) | 52 (2.0) | 45 (1.8) | 45 (1.8) | 39 (1.5) | 8 (0.3) | 1 (0.0) | 0 (0) | 0 (0) | 1 (0.0) | 5 (0.2) | 44 (1.7) | 53 (2.1) | 293 (11.4) |
| Average relative humidity (%) | 62 | 55 | 45 | 45 | 37 | 27 | 25 | 26 | 28 | 37 | 53 | 60 | 41.7 |
| Mean monthly sunshine hours | 208 | 220 | 250 | 239 | 303 | 333 | 326 | 322 | 311 | 284 | 216 | 203 | 3,215.3 |
Source: Chaharmahalmet
