= Farrokhshahr County =

County in Chaharmahal and Bakhtiari province, Iran

Farrokhshahr County Persian: شهرستان فرخ‌شهر
- County
- Location of Farrokhshahr County in Chaharmahal and Bakhtiari province (center right, purple)

- Location of Chaharmahal and Bakhtiari province in Iran
- Coordinates: 32°11′N 51°03′E
- Country: Iran
- Province: Chaharmahal and Bakhtiari
- Established: 2023
- Capital: Farrokh Shahr
- Districts: Central, Dastgerd
- Time zone: UTC+3:30 (IRST)

Farrokhshahr County (Persian: شهرستان فرخ‌شهر) is in Chaharmahal and Bakhtiari province, Iran. Its capital is the city of Farrokh Shahr, whose population at the time of the 2016 National Census was 31,739 people in 9,292 households.

== History ==
In 2013, the city of Farrokh Shahr was separated from the Central District of Shahrekord County, and Dastgerd Rural District from Kiar County, in the formation of Farrokhshahr District.

In 2023, the district was separated from the county in the establishment of Farrokhshahr County, which was divided into two districts and three rural districts, with Farrokh Shahr as its capital and only city at the time.

== Demographics ==
=== Administrative divisions ===
Farrokhshahr County's administrative structure is shown in the following table.

Farrokhshahr County
Administrative Divisions
Central District
Qahfarrokh RD
Farrokh Shahr (city)
Dastgerd District
Dastgerd RD
Surk RD
RD = Rural District

== See also ==
Media related to Farrokhshahr County at Wikimedia Commons
