= Naghan =

City in Chaharmahal and Bakhtiari province, Iran

Naghan Persian: ناغان
- City
- Location within Iran
- Coordinates: 31°56′12″N 50°43′53″E
- Country: Iran
- Province: Chaharmahal and Bakhtiari
- County: Kiar
- District: Naghan
- Established as a city: 1994

Population (2016)
  - Total: 6,125
- Time zone: UTC+3:30 (IRST)

Naghan (Persian: ناغان) (Note: Also romanized as Nāghān) is a city in, and the capital of, Naghan District in Kiar County, Chaharmahal and Bakhtiari province, Iran. It also serves as the administrative center for Naghan Rural District. The village of Naghan was converted to a city in 1994.

== Demographics ==
=== Ethnicity ===
The city is populated by Lurs.

=== Population ===
At the time of the 2006 National Census, the city's population was 4,928 in 1,210 households, when it was in the Central District of Ardal County. The following census in 2011 counted 4,861 people in 1,345 households, by which time the city and the rural district had been separated from the county in the establishment of Kiar County and transferred to the new Naghan District. The 2016 census measured the population of the city as 6,125 people in 1,842 households.
