= Kiar-e Sharqi Rural District =

Rural district in Chaharmahal and Bakhtiari province, Iran

Kiar-e Sharqi Rural District Persian: دهستان کیار شرقی
- Rural District
- Location within Iran
- Coordinates: 32°05′11″N 50°57′47″E
- Country: Iran
- Province: Chaharmahal and Bakhtiari
- County: Kiar
- District: Kiar-e Sharqi
- Established: 1987
- Capital: Dezak

Population (2016)
  - Total: 7,699
- Time zone: UTC+3:30 (IRST)

Kiar-e Sharqi Rural District (Persian: دهستان کیار شرقی) (Note: Formerly Dastgerd Rural District (دهستان دستگرد)) is in Kiar-e Sharqi District of Kiar County, Chaharmahal and Bakhtiari province, Iran. Its capital is the village of Dezak. The previous capital of the rural district was the village of Shahrak-e Adel.

== Demographics ==
=== Population ===
At the time of the 2006 National Census, the rural district's population (as a part of the former Kiar District in Shahrekord County) was 8,540 in 2,041 households. There were 8,356 inhabitants in 2,353 households at the following census of 2011, by which time the district had been separated from the county in the establishment of Kiar County. The rural district was transferred to the new Central District. The 2016 census measured the population of the rural district as 7,699 in 2,335 households. The most populous of its five villages was Dezak, with 2,942 people.

In 2023, the rural district was separated from the district in the formation of Kiar-e Sharqi District.

=== Other villages in the rural district ===
- Qaleh Salim
