= Farrokhshahr District =

Former district in Chaharmahal and Bakhtiari province, Iran

Farrokhshahr District Persian: بخش فرخ‌شهر
- Former District
- Location within Iran
- Coordinates: 32°11′N 51°03′E
- Country: Iran
- Province: Chaharmahal and Bakhtiari
- County: Shahrekord
- Established: 2013
- Capital: Farrokh Shahr

Population (2016)
  - Total: 37,068
- Time zone: UTC+3:30 (IRST)

Forrokhshahr District (Persian: بخش فرخ‌شهر) is a former administrative division of Shahrekord County, Chaharmahal and Bakhtiari province, Iran. Its capital was the city of Farrokh Shahr.

== History ==
In 2013, Farrokh Shahr was transferred from the Central District, and Dastgerd Rural District from Kiar County, in the formation of Farrokhshahr District. In 2023, the district was separated from the county in the establishment of Farrokhshahr County.

== Demographics ==
=== Population ===
At the time of the 2016 census, the district's population was 37,068 inhabitants living in 10,934 households.

=== Administrative divisions ===
Farrokhshahr District Population
Administrative Divisions	2016
Dastgerd RD	4,350
Qahfarrokh RD	979
Farrokh Shahr (city)	31,739
Total	37,068
RD = Rural District
