= Dastgerd Rural District (Farrokhshahr County) =

Rural district in Chaharmahal and Bakhtiari province, Iran

Dastgerd Rural District Persian: دهستان دستگرد
- Rural District
- Location within Iran
- Coordinates: 32°06′N 50°59′E
- Country: Iran
- Province: Chaharmahal and Bakhtiari
- County: Farrokhshahr
- District: Dastgerd
- Capital: Dastgerd-e Emamzadeh

Population (2016)
  - Total: 4,350
- Time zone: UTC+3:30 (IRST)

Dastgerd Rural District (Persian: دهستان دستگرد) is in Dastgerd District of Farrokhshahr County, Chaharmahal and Bakhtiari province, Iran. Its capital is the village of Dastgerd-e Emamzadeh.

== Demographics ==
=== Population ===
At the time of the 2006 National Census, the rural district's population (as a part of the former Kiar District in Shahrekord County) was 6,120 in 1,527 households. There were 6,090 inhabitants in 1,785 households at the following census of 2011, by which time it had been separated from the county in the establishment of Kiar County. The 2016 census measured the population of the rural district as 4,350 in 1,341 households, when it had been separated from the county in the formation of Farrokhshahr District in Shahrekord County. The most populous of its four villages was Dastgerd-e Emamzadeh, with 2,810 people.

In 2023, the district was separated from the county in the establishment of Farrokhshahr County, and the rural district was transferred to the new Dastgerd District.
