= Naghan Rural District =

Rural district in Chaharmahal and Bakhtiari province, Iran

Naghan Rural District Persian: دهستان ناغان
- Rural District
- Location within Iran
- Coordinates: 31°51′N 50°49′E
- Country: Iran
- Province: Chaharmahal and Bakhtiari
- County: Kiar
- District: Naghan
- Established: 1987
- Capital: Naghan

Population (2016)
  - Total: 2,739
- Time zone: UTC+3:30 (IRST)

Naghan Rural District (Persian: دهستان ناغان) is in Naghan District of Kiar County, Chaharmahal and Bakhtiari province, Iran. It is administered from the city of Naghan.

== Demographics ==
=== Population ===
At the time of the 2006 National Census, the rural district's population (as a part of the Central District of Ardal County) was 3,286 in 739 households. There were 3,060 inhabitants in 783 households at the following census of 2011, by which time it had been separated from the county in the establishment of Kiar County. The rural district was transferred to the new Naghan District. The 2016 census measured the population of the rural district as 2,739 in 813 households. The most populous of its 24 villages was Heydarabad, (Note: Formerly known as Adelabad) with 525 people.

=== Other villages in the rural district ===
- Chehraz
- Jaghdan
- Kahandezh (Note: Formerly Gav Tut)
