= Central District (Kiar County) =

District in Chaharmahal and Bakhtiari province, Iran

Central District (Kiar County) Persian: بخش مرکزی شهرستان کیار
- District
- Location within Iran
- Coordinates: 32°04′N 50°51′E
- Country: Iran
- Province: Chaharmahal and Bakhtiari
- County: Kiar
- Established: 2007
- Capital: Shalamzar

Population (2016)
  - Total: 35,015
- Time zone: UTC+3:30 (IRST)

The Central District of Kiar County (Persian: بخش مرکزی شهرستان کیار) is in Chaharmahal and Bakhtiari province, Iran. Its capital is the city of Shalamzar.

== History ==
In 2007, Kiar District of Shahrekord County, and Mashayekh and Naghan Rural Districts, and the city of Naghan were separated from Ardal County in the establishment of Kiar County, which was divided into two districts and five rural districts, with Shalamzar as its capital.

In 2013, Dastgerd Rural District was separated from the county to rejoin Shahrekord County.

In 2023, Kharaji Rural District was created in the Central District, and Kiar-e Sharqi Rural District was separated from it in the formation of Kiar-e Sharqi District.

== Demographics ==
=== Population ===
At the time of the 2011 National Census, the district's population was 42,540 people in 12,343 households. The 2016 census measured the population of the district as 35,015 inhabitants living in 10,853 households.

=== Administrative divisions ===
Central District (Kiar County) Population
| Administrative Divisions | 2011 | 2016 |
|---|---|---|
| Dastgerd RD (Note: Transferred to Shahrekord County) | 6,090 | |
| Kharaji RD (Note: Established after the 2016 census) | | |
| Kiar-e Gharbi RD (Note: Formerly Shalamzar Rural District) | 9,814 | 9,011 |
| Kiar-e Sharqi RD (Note: Transferred to Kiar-e Sharqi District) | 8,356 | 7,699 |
| Dastana (city) | 5,199 | 5,143 |
| Gahru (city) | 5,949 | 6,263 |
| Shalamzar (city) | 7,132 | 6,899 |
| Total | 42,540 | 35,015 |
RD = Rural District
