= Mashayekh Rural District (Kiar County) =

Rural district in Chaharmahal and Bakhtiari province, Iran

Mashayekh Rural District Persian: دهستان مشايخ
- Rural District
- Location within Iran
- Coordinates: 31°48′N 50°45′E
- Country: Iran
- Province: Chaharmahal and Bakhtiari
- County: Kiar
- District: Naghan
- Established: 1990
- Capital: Do Polan

Population (2016)
  - Total: 7,093
- Time zone: UTC+3:30 (IRST)

Mashayekh Rural District (Persian: دهستان مشايخ) is in Naghan District of Kiar County, Chaharmahal and Bakhtiari province, Iran. Its capital is the village of Do Polan.

== Demographics ==
=== Population ===
At the time of the 2006 National Census, the rural district's population (as a part of the Central District in Ardal County) was 7,158 in 1,585 households. There were 7,586 inhabitants in 1,827 households at the following census of 2011, by which time it had been separated from the county in the establishment of Kiar County. The rural district was transferred to the new Naghan District. The 2016 census measured the population of the rural district as 7,093 in 2,040 households. The most populous of its 27 villages was Madan, with 1,320 people.

=== Other villages in the rural district ===
- Berenjgan
- Jowzestan
- Shahrak-e Durak
