= Doshman Ziari Rural District (Mamasani County) =

Rural district in Fars province, Iran

Doshman Ziari Rural District Persian: دهستان دشمن زيارئ
- Rural District
- Location within Iran
- Coordinates: 29°59′33″N 51°57′10″E
- Country: Iran
- Province: Fars
- County: Mamasani
- District: Doshman Ziari
- Capital: Dowlatabad

Population (2016)
  - Total: 4,542
- Time zone: UTC+3:30 (IRST)

Doshman Ziari Rural District (Persian: دهستان دشمن زيارئ) is in Doshman Ziari District of Mamasani County, Fars province, Iran. Its capital is the village of Dowlatabad.

== Demographics ==
=== Population ===
At the time of the 2006 National Census, the rural district's population was 4,944 in 1,254 households. There were 4,840 inhabitants in 1,354 households at the following census of 2011. The 2016 census measured the population of the rural district as 4,542 in 1,431 households. The most populous of its 33 villages was Deh Gap-e Mahmudi, with 502 people.
