= Naghan District =

District in Chaharmahal and Bakhtiari province, Iran

Naghan District Persian: بخش ناغان
- District
- Location within Iran
- Coordinates: 31°49′N 50°46′E
- Country: Iran
- Province: Chaharmahal and Bakhtiari
- County: Kiar
- Established: 2007
- Capital: Naghan

Population (2016)
  - Total: 15,957
- Time zone: UTC+3:30 (IRST)

Naghan District (Persian: بخش ناغان) is in Kiar County, Chaharmahal and Bakhtiari province, Iran. Its capital is the city of Naghan.

== History ==
In 2007, Kiar District of Shahrekord County, and Mashayekh and Naghan Rural Districts, and the city of Naghan, were separated from Ardal County in the establishment of Kiar County, which was divided into two districts and five rural districts, with the city of Shalamzar as its capital.

== Demographics ==
=== Population ===
At the time of the 2011 National Census, the district's population was 15,507 people in 3,955 households. The 2016 census measured the population of the district as 15,957 inhabitants living in 4,695 households.

=== Administrative divisions ===
Naghan District Population
Administrative Divisions	2011	2016
Mashayekh RD	7,586	7,093
Naghan RD	3,060	2,739
Naghan (city)	4,861	6,125
Total	15,507	15,957
RD = Rural District
