= Doshman Ziari District =

District in Fars province, Iran

Doshman Ziari District Persian: بخش دشمن ‌زیاری
- District
- Location within Iran
- Coordinates: 29°58′18″N 51°57′11″E
- Country: Iran
- Province: Fars
- County: Mamasani
- Capital: Dowlatabad

Population (2016)
  - Total: 9,326
- Time zone: UTC+3:30 (IRST)

Doshman Ziari District (Persian: بخش دشمن‌ زیاری) is in Mamasani County, Fars province, Iran. Its capital is the village of Dowlatabad.

== Demographics ==
=== Population ===
At the time of the 2006 National Census, the district's population was 10,196 in 2,526 households. The following census in 2011 counted 9,463 people in 2,685 households. The 2016 census measured the population of the district as 9,326 inhabitants in 2,969 households.

=== Administrative divisions ===
Doshman Ziari District Population
Administrative Divisions	2006	2011	2016
Doshman Ziari RD	4,944	4,840	4,542
Mashayekh RD	5,252	4,623	4,784
Total	10,196	9,463	9,326
RD = Rural District
