= Central District (Ardal County) =

District in Chaharmahal and Bakhtiari province, Iran

Central District (Ardal County) Persian: بخش مرکزی شهرستان اردل
- District
- Location within Iran
- Coordinates: 32°02′N 50°27′E
- Country: Iran
- Province: Chaharmahal and Bakhtiari
- County: Ardal
- Established: 1990

Population (2016)
  - Total: 35,179
- Time zone: UTC+3:30 (IRST)

The Central District of Ardal County (Persian: بخش مرکزی شهرستان اردل) is in Chaharmahal and Bakhtiari province, Iran. Its capital is the city of Ardal.

== History ==
In 2007, Mashayekh and Naghan Rural Districts, and the city of Naghan, were separated from the district in the establishment of Kiar County.

In 2013, the villages of Dashtak and Kaj were converted to cities.

== Demographics ==
=== Population ===
At the time of the 2006 National Census, the district's population was 51,960 in 11,163 households. The following census in 2011 counted 37,187 people in 8,978 households. The 2016 census measured the population of the district as 35,179 inhabitants living in 9,434 households.

=== Administrative divisions ===
Central District (Ardal County) Population
Administrative Divisions	2006	2011	2016
Dinaran RD	7,548	6,800	5,890
Mashayekh RD (Note: Transferred to Kiar County)	7,158		
Naghan RD	3,286		
Poshtkuh RD	20,878	21,395	10,933
Ardal (city)	8,162	8,992	10,113
Dashtak (city)			4,016
Kaj (city)			4,227
Naghan (city)	4,928		
Total	51,960	37,187	35,179
RD = Rural District
