= Kiar District =

Former district in Chaharmahal and Bakhtiari province, Iran

Kiar District Persian: بخش کیار
- Former District
- Location within Iran
- Coordinates: 31°54′N 50°45′E
- Country: Iran
- Province: Chaharmahal and Bakhtiari
- County: Shahrekord
- Capital: Shalamzar

Population (2006)
  - Total: 43,108
- Time zone: UTC+3:30 (IRST)

Kiar District (Persian: بخش کیار) is a former administrative division of Shahrekord County, Chaharmahal and Bakhtiari province, Iran. Its capital was the city of Shalamzar.

== History ==
In 2007, the district was separated from the county in the establishment of Kiar County.

== Demographics ==
=== Population ===
At the time of the 2006 census, the district's population was 43,108 in 10,601 households.

=== Administrative divisions ===
Kiar District Population
Administrative Divisions	2006
Dastgerd RD	6,120
Kiar-e Gharbi RD (Note: Formerly Shalamzar Rural District)	15,352
Kiar-e Sharqi RD (Note: Formerly Dastgerd Rural District)	8,540
Gahru (city)	6,093
Shalamzar (city)	7,003
Total	43,108
RD = Rural District
