= Kiar County =

County in Chaharmahal and Bakhtiari province, Iran

Kiar County Persian: شهرستان کیار
- County
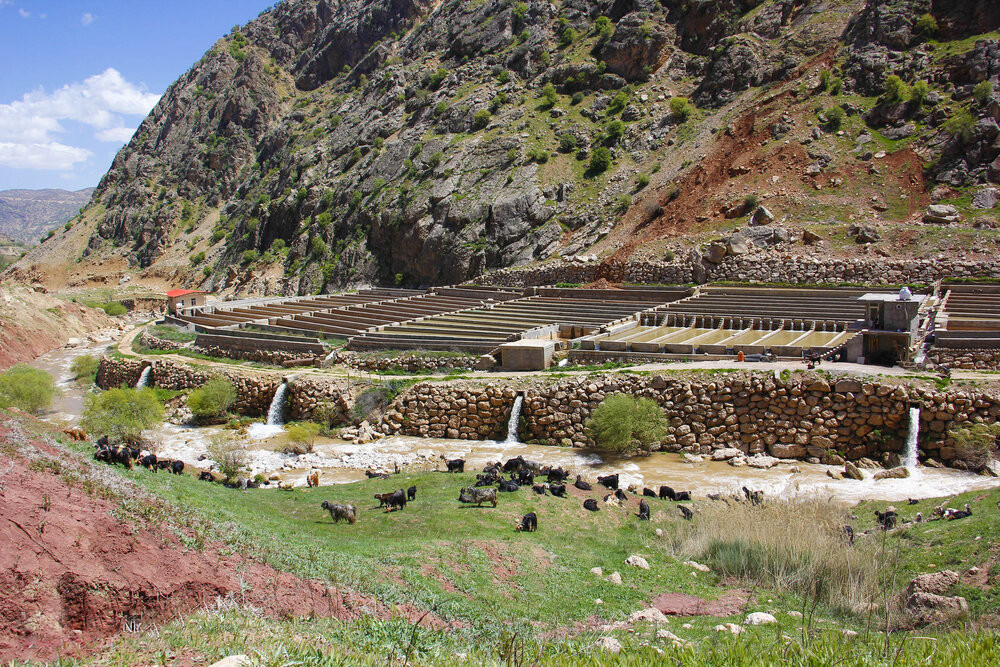
- The village of Kavand-e Darvishan

- Location of Kiar County in Chaharmahal and Bakhtiari province (center, yellow)

- Location of Chaharmahal and Bakhtiari province in Iran
- Coordinates: 31°54′N 50°45′E
- Country: Iran
- Province: Chaharmahal and Bakhtiari
- Established: 2007
- Capital: Shalamzar
- Districts: Central, Kiar-e Sharqi, Naghan

Population (2016)
  - Total: 50,976
- Time zone: UTC+3:30 (IRST)

Kiar County (Persian: شهرستان کیار) is in Chaharmahal and Bakhtiari province, Iran. Its capital is the city of Shalamzar.

== History ==
In 2007, Kiar District of Shahrekord County, and Mashayekh and Naghan Rural Districts, and the city of Naghan, were separated from Ardal County in the establishment of Kiar County, which was divided into two districts and five rural districts, with Shalamzar as its capital.

In 2013, Dastgerd Rural District was separated from the county to rejoin Shahrekord County.

In 2023, Kharaji Rural District was created in the Central District, and Kiar-e Sharqi Rural District was separated from it in the formation of Kiar-e Sharqi District, which was divided into two rural districts including the new Kiar-e Bala Rural District.

== Demographics ==
=== Population ===
At the time of the 2011 National Census, the county's population was 58,047 people in 16,298 households. The 2016 census measured the population of the county as 50,976 in 15,548 households.

=== Administrative divisions ===
Kiar County's population history and administrative structure over two consecutive censuses are shown in the following table.

Kiar County Population
Administrative Divisions	2011	2016
Central District	42,540	35,015
Dastgerd RD (Note: Transferred to Shahrekord County)	6,090	
Kharaji RD (Note: Established after the 2016 census)		
Kiar-e Gharbi RD (Note: Formerly Shalamzar Rural District)	9,814	9,011
Kiar-e Sharqi RD	8,356	7,699
Dastana (city)	5,199	5,143
Gahru (city)	5,949	6,263
Shalamzar (city)	7,132	6,899
Kiar-e Sharqi District		
Kiar-e Bala RD		
Kiar-e Sharqi RD (Note: Formerly Dastgerd Rural District)		
Naghan District	15,507	15,957
Mashayekh RD	7,586	7,093
Naghan RD	3,060	2,739
Naghan (city)	4,861	6,125
Total	58,047	50,976
RD = Rural District

== See also ==
Media related to Kiar County at Wikimedia Commons
