= Gandomkar =

Gandomkar (Persian: گندمكار) may refer to:

- Gandomkar-e Khalili, Chaharmahal and Bakhtiari Province
- Gandomkar-e Olya, Chaharmahal and Bakhtiari Province
- Gandomkar-e Sofla, Chaharmahal and Bakhtiari Province
- Gandomkar-e Vosta, Chaharmahal and Bakhtiari Province
- Gandomkar, Kohgiluyeh and Boyer-Ahmad
