= Shalil =

Shalil or Shelil (Persian: شليل) may refer to:

- Shalil-e Olya, Chaharmahal and Bakhtiari Province, Iran
- Shalil-e Sofla, Chaharmahal and Bakhtiari Province, Iran
- Shalil Rural District, Chaharmahal and Bakhtiari Province, Iran
- Shalil, Khwahan (Persian: شالیل), Afghanistan
