= Kaloch Do Ab =

Village in Badakhshan province, Afghanistan

Kaloch Do Ab کلوچ دو آب (Persian)
- Village
- Location in Afghanistan
- Coordinates: 37°20′15.396″N 70°54′0.252″E
- Country: Afghanistan
- Province: Badakhshan
- District: Arghanj Khwa
- Elevation: 4,095 m (13,435 ft)
- Time zone: UTC+04:30 (AST)
- Postal code: 3468

Kaloch Do Ab (Persian: کلوچ دو آب) is a village in Arghanj Khwa district, Badakhshan province, northeastern Afghanistan.

== Nearby villages ==
Approximately 2.24 km (1.39 mi) away from Kaloch Do Ab is a village in Shighnan district known as Qal'eh-ye Mirza Shah.
