= Darreh Dun =

Darreh Dun or Darrehdun or Darreh-ye Dun (Persian: دره دون) may refer to:

- Darreh Dun, Chaharmahal and Bakhtiari
- Darreh Dun, Andika, Khuzestan Province
- Darreh Dun, Ramhormoz, Khuzestan Province
