= Khambayo Bala =

Khambayo Bala خامبایو بالا (Persian)
- Village
- Location in Afghanistan
- Coordinates: 37°11′55.752″N 70°47′8.952″E
- Country: Afghanistan
- Province: Badakhshan
- District: Arghanj Khwa
- Elevation: 3,630 m (11,910 ft)
- Time zone: UTC+04:30 (AST)
- Postal code: 3468

Khambayo Bala (Persian: خامبایو بالا) is a village in Arghanj Khwa district, Badakhshan province, northeastern Afghanistan.

== Nearby villages ==
Approximately 1.55 km (0.96 mi) away from Khambayo Bala is another village in Arghanj Khwa district known as Astaraj.
