= Kolan, Afghanistan =

Kolan کولان (Persian) Kulan, Kūlān
- Village
- Location in Afghanistan
- Coordinates: 37°13′25.284″N 70°46′15.312″E
- Country: Afghanistan
- Province: Badakhshan
- District: Arghanj Khwa
- Elevation: 3,074 m (10,085 ft)
- Time zone: UTC+04:30 (AST)
- Postal code: 3468

Kolan (Persian: کولان), also known as Kulan or Kūlān, is a village in Arghanj Khwa district, Badakhshan province, northeastern Afghanistan.

== Nearby villages ==
Approximately 2.98 km (1.85 mi) away from Kolan is another village in Arghanj Khwa district known as Banew.
