= Morghak, Badakhshan =

Morghak مرغک (Persian)
- Village
- Location in Afghanistan
- Coordinates: 37°13′15.132″N 70°43′36.552″E
- Country: Afghanistan
- Province: Badakhshan
- District: Arghanj Khwa
- Elevation: 3,064 m (10,052 ft)
- Time zone: UTC+04:30 (AST)
- Postal code: 3468

Morghak (Persian: مرغک) is a village in Arghanj Khwa district, Badakhshan province, northeastern Afghanistan.

== Nearby villages ==
Approximately 2.16 km (1.34 mi) away from Morghak is another village in Arghanj Khwa district known as Ghala Dara Bala.
