= Gel-e Shur =

Goolshor گلشور
- Village
- Location within Iran
- Coordinates: 31°44′00″N 50°32′36″E
- Country: Iran
- Province: Chaharmahal and Bakhtiari
- County: Ardal
- Bakhsh: Miankuh
- Rural District: Miankuh

Population (2006)
  - Total: 173
- Time zone: UTC+3:30 (IRST)
  - Summer (DST): UTC+4:30 (IRDT)

Gel-e Shur (Persian: گل شور, also Romanized as Gel-e Shūr; also known as Galū Shūr, Geleh Shūr, and Goleh Shūr) is a village in Miankuh Rural District, Miankuh District, Ardal County, Chaharmahal and Bakhtiari Province, Iran. At the 2006 census, its population was 173, in 34 families.
