= Landi, Iran =

Village in Chaharmahal and Bakhtiari province, Iran

Landi Persian: لندي
- Village
- Location within Iran
- Coordinates: 31°50′12″N 50°19′03″E
- Country: Iran
- Province: Chaharmahal and Bakhtiari
- County: Ardal
- District: Miankuh
- Rural District: Shalil

Population (2016)
  - Total: 574
- Time zone: UTC+3:30 (IRST)

Landi (Persian: لندي) (Note: Also romanized as Landī) is a village in Shalil Rural District of Miankuh District in Ardal County, Chaharmahal and Bakhtiari province, Iran.

== Demographics ==
=== Ethnicity ===
The village is populated by Lurs.

=== Population ===
At the time of the 2006 National Census, the village's population was 760 in 148 households. The following census in 2011 counted 724 people in 144 households. The 2016 census measured the population of the village as 574 people in 136 households.
