= Gandomkar-e Olya =

Gandomkar-e Olya گندمكارعليا
- Village
- Location within Iran
- Coordinates: 31°49′02″N 50°33′25″E
- Country: Iran
- Province: Chaharmahal and Bakhtiari
- County: Ardal
- Bakhsh: Miankuh
- Rural District: Miankuh

Population (2006)
  - Total: 302
- Time zone: UTC+3:30 (IRST)
  - Summer (DST): UTC+4:30 (IRDT)

Gandomkar-e Olya (Persian: گندمكارعليا, also Romanized as Gandomkār-e ‘Olyā) is a village in Miankuh Rural District, Miankuh District, Ardal County, Chaharmahal and Bakhtiari Province, Iran. At the 2006 census, its population was 302, in 65 families. The village is populated by Lurs.
