= Galeh =

Galeh or Geleh (Persian: گله) may refer to:

- Geleh, Khuzestan, a village in Khuzestan Province in Iran
- Geleh, Kurdistan
- Galeh, Lorestan

== See also ==
- Geleh Shur
