= Qaidan, Chaharmahal and Bakhtiari =

Qaidan قائيدان
- Village
- Location within Iran
- Coordinates: 31°40′55″N 50°37′19″E
- Country: Iran
- Province: Chaharmahal and Bakhtiari
- County: Ardal
- Bakhsh: Miankuh
- Rural District: Miankuh

Population (2006)
  - Total: 276
- Time zone: UTC+3:30 (IRST)
  - Summer (DST): UTC+4:30 (IRDT)

Qaidan (Persian: قائيدان, also Romanized as Qā’īdān; also known as Qā’īdān Shīāsī) is a village in Miankuh Rural District, Miankuh District, Ardal County, Chaharmahal and Bakhtiari Province, Iran. At the 2006 census, its population was 276, in 58 families. The village is populated by Lurs.
