= Kamar Saighan =

Kamar Saighan کمر سیغان (Persian)
- Village
- Location in Afghanistan
- Coordinates: 37°23′44.34″N 70°51′54.324″E
- Country: Afghanistan
- Province: Badakhshan
- District: Arghanj Khwa
- Elevation: 4,284 m (14,055 ft)
- Time zone: UTC+04:30 (AST)
- Postal code: 3468

Kamar Saighan (Persian: کمر سیغان) is a village in Arghanj Khwa district, Badakhshan province, northeastern Afghanistan.

== Nearby villages ==
Approximately 3.38 km (2.10 mi) away from Kamar Saighan is another village in Arghanj Khwa district known as Sar Sang.
