= Shahrak-e Shiasi =

Village in Chaharmahal and Bakhtiari province, Iran

Shahrak-e Shiasi Persian: شهرك شياسي
- Village
- Location within Iran
- Coordinates: 31°41′21″N 50°37′23″E
- Country: Iran
- Province: Chaharmahal and Bakhtiari
- County: Ardal
- District: Miankuh
- Rural District: Miankuh

Population (2016)
  - Total: 671
- Time zone: UTC+3:30 (IRST)

Shahrak-e Shiasi (Persian: شهرك شياسي) (Note: Also romanized as Shahrak-e Shīāsī; also known as Sheyāsī, Shias, Shīāsī, and Shiyasi) is a village in Miankuh Rural District of Miankuh District in Ardal County, Chaharmahal and Bakhtiari province, Iran.

== Demographics ==
=== Ethnicity ===
The village is populated by Lurs.

=== Population ===
At the time of the 2006 National Census, the village's population was 675 in 139 households. The following census in 2011 counted 589 people in 156 households. The 2016 census measured the population of the village as 671 people in 193 households.
