= Deh-e Azizi Gandomkar-e Vosta =

Deh-e Azizi Gandomkar-e Vosta ده عزيزي گندمكاروسطي
- Village
- Location within Iran
- Coordinates: 31°48′52″N 50°33′57″E
- Country: Iran
- Province: Chaharmahal and Bakhtiari
- County: Ardal
- Bakhsh: Miankuh
- Rural District: Miankuh

Population (2006)
  - Total: 152
- Time zone: UTC+3:30 (IRST)
  - Summer (DST): UTC+4:30 (IRDT)

Deh-e Azizi Gandomkar-e Vosta (Persian: ده عزيزي گندمكاروسطي, also Romanized as Deh-e ʿAzīzī Gandomkār-e Vosţá; also known as Gandomkār-e Vosţá) is a village in Miankuh Rural District, Miankuh District, Ardal County, Chaharmahal and Bakhtiari Province, Iran. At the 2006 census, its population was 152, in 32 families. The village is populated by Lurs.
