= Refen =

Village in Chaharmahal and Bakhtiari province, Iran

Refen Persian: رفن
- Village
- Location within Iran
- Coordinates: 31°40′23″N 50°37′14″E
- Country: Iran
- Province: Chaharmahal and Bakhtiari
- County: Ardal
- District: Miankuh
- Rural District: Miankuh

Population (2016)
  - Total: 991
- Time zone: UTC+3:30 (IRST)

Refen (Persian: رفن) is a village in Miankuh Rural District of Miankuh District in Ardal County, Chaharmahal and Bakhtiari province, Iran.

== Demographics ==
=== Ethnicity ===
The village is populated by Lurs.

=== Population ===
At the time of the 2006 National Census, the village's population was 863 in 198 households. The following census in 2011 counted 919 people in 243 households. The 2016 census measured the population of the village as 991 people in 271 households. It was the most populous village in its rural district.
