= Shalil-e Olya =

Shalil-e Olya شليل عليا
- Village
- Location within Iran
- Coordinates: 31°44′32″N 50°27′24″E
- Country: Iran
- Province: Chaharmahal and Bakhtiari
- County: Ardal
- Bakhsh: Miankuh
- Rural District: Shalil

Population (2006)
  - Total: 685
- Time zone: UTC+3:30 (IRST)
  - Summer (DST): UTC+4:30 (IRDT)

Shalil-e Olya (Persian: شليل عليا, also Romanized as Shalīl-e ‘Olyā; also known as Shalīl-e Bālā) is a village in Shalil Rural District, Miankuh District, Ardal County, Chaharmahal and Bakhtiari Province, Iran. At the 2006 census, its population was 685, in 136 families. The village is populated by Lurs.
