= Astaraj =

Village in Badakhshan province, Afghanistan

Astaraj آسترج (Persian)
- Village
- Location in Afghanistan
- Coordinates: 37°11′7″N 70°47′25″E
- Country: Afghanistan
- Province: Badakhshan
- District: Arghanj Khwa
- Elevation: 3,093 m (10,148 ft)
- Time zone: UTC+04:30 (AST)
- Postal code: 3468

Astaraj (Persian: آسترج) is a village in Arghanj Khwa district, Badakhshan province, northeastern Afghanistan.

== Nearby villages ==
Approximately 1.09 km (0.68 mi) away from Astaraj, is another village in Arghanj Khwa district known as Nahmat Abad.
