= Dasht Pang =

Village in Badakhshan province, Afghanistan

Dasht Pang دشت پنگ (Persian)
- Village
- Location in Afghanistan
- Coordinates: 37°8′42″N 70°45′35″E
- Country: Afghanistan
- Province: Badakhshan
- District: Arghanj Khwa
- Elevation: 3,677 m (12,064 ft)
- Time zone: UTC+04:30 (AST)
- Postal code: 3468

Dasht Pang (Persian: دشت پنگ) is a village in Arghanj Khwa district, Badakhshan province, northeastern Afghanistan.

== Nearby villages ==
Approximately 2.26 km (1.40 mi) away from Dasht Pang is another village in Arghanj Khwa district known as Lakeow.
