= Arghanj Khwa District =

Arghanjkhwa ارغنجخواه
- District
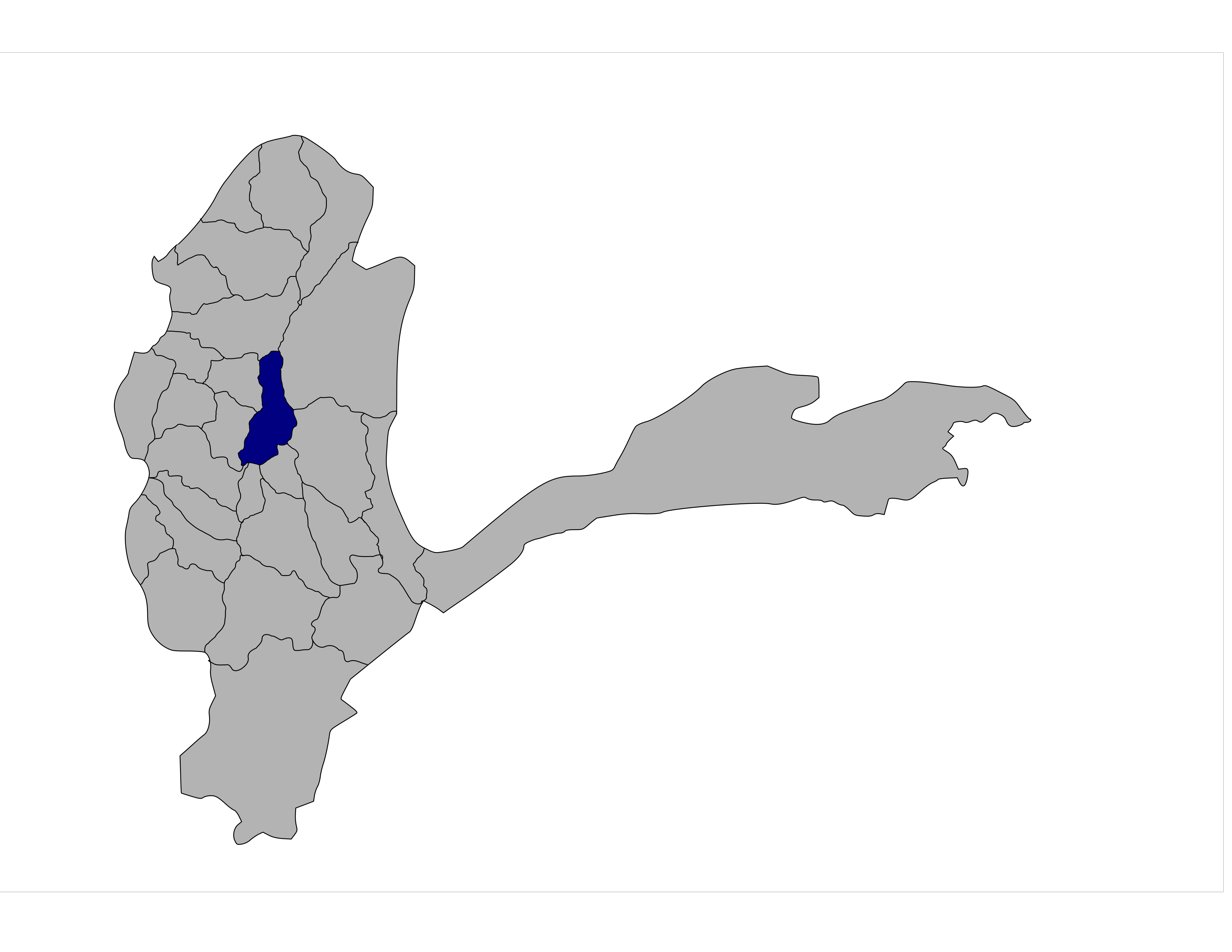

- Location in Afghanistan
- Coordinates: 36°57′N 70°7′E
- Country: Afghanistan
- Province: Badakhshan

Government
  - Type: District council

Area
  - Total: 2.327 km^{2} (0.898 sq mi)
- Elevation: 2,999 m (9,839 ft)

Population
  - Estimate (2025): 19,837
- Time zone: UTC+04:30 (Afghanistan Time)
- Postal code: 3468

Arghanjkhwa (Dari: ولسوالی ارغنجخواه; Pashto: د ارغنخواه ولسوالۍ) is a district of Badakhshan Province in northeastern Afghanistan. It has an estimated population of 19,837 people.

Arghanjkhwa was created in 2005 from part of Fayzabad district.

On 7 February 2026, a tragic road accident occurred in the district in which 15 people were killed.

== Villages ==
Villages in Arghanj Khwa district include Aryan, Astaraj, Banew, Dasht Pang, Dasht Shmera, Ghala Dara Bala, Ghala Dara Payen, Jangalak, Kaloch Do Ab, Kamar Saighan, Khambayo Bala, Khambayo Payen, Khanaqa, Kolan, Lakeow, Morghak, Nahmat Abad, Naran Shahr Bala, Now Abad, Razan, Sandara, Sar Sang, Seni Mayet, Tagabak, Takhsab, Waran Shahr Payen, and War Nail.

== See also ==
- Districts of Afghanistan
