= Dasht Shmera =

Village in Badakhshan province, Afghanistan

Dasht Shmera دشت شمراء (Persian)
- Village
- Location in Afghanistan
- Coordinates: 37°4′15.78″N 70°42′4.716″E
- Country: Afghanistan
- Province: Badakhshan
- District: Arghanj Khwa
- Elevation: 4,353 m (14,281 ft)
- Time zone: UTC+04:30 (AST)
- Postal code: 3468

Dasht Shmera (Persian: دشت شمراء) is a village in Arghanj Khwa district, Badakhshan province, northeastern Afghanistan.

== Nearby villages ==
Approximately 1.35 km (0.84 mi) away from Dasht Shmera is another village in Arghanj Khwa district known as Razan.
