= Darreh Dun, Chaharmahal and Bakhtiari =

Darreh Dun دره دون
- Village
- Country: Iran
- Province: Chaharmahal and Bakhtiari
- County: Ardal
- Bakhsh: Miankuh
- Rural District: Miankuh

Population (2006)
  - Total: 172
- Time zone: UTC+3:30 (IRST)
  - Summer (DST): UTC+4:30 (IRDT)

Darreh Dun (Persian: دره دون, also Romanized as Darreh Dūn) is a village in Miankuh Rural District, Miankuh District, Ardal County, Chaharmahal and Bakhtiari Province, Iran. At the 2006 census, its population was 172, in 37 families. The village is populated by Lurs.
