= Khanaqa, Arghanj Khwa =

Khanaqa خانقاه (Persian) Khanaqah, Khānaqāh,Khāneqāh
- Village
- Location in Afghanistan
- Coordinates: 37°10′21.936″N 70°45′26.676″E
- Country: Afghanistan
- Province: Badakhshan
- District: Arghanj Khwa
- Elevation: 3,703 m (12,149 ft)
- Time zone: UTC+04:30 (AST)
- Postal code: 3468

Khanaqa (Persian: خانقاه), also known as Khanaqah, Khānaqāh, or Khāneqāh, is a village in Arghanj Khwa district, Badakhshan province, northeastern Afghanistan.

== Geography ==
=== Climate ===
The Köppen climate classification classifies Khanaqa's climate as a warm, dry-summer continental climate (Köppen: Dsb), meaning that it experiences dry summers, and gets less than 30 mm (1.2 in) of precipitation during the driest month.

=== Nearby villages ===
Approximately 0.55 km (0.34 mi) away from Khanaqa is another village in Arghanj Khwa district known as Tagabak.
