= Nahmat Abad =

Nahmat Abad نهمت آباد (Persian)
- Village
- Location in Afghanistan
- Coordinates: 37°10′32.772″N 70°47′15.72″E
- Country: Afghanistan
- Province: Badakhshan
- District: Arghanj Khwa
- Elevation: 3,056 m (10,026 ft)
- Time zone: UTC+04:30 (AST)
- Postal code: 3468

Nahmat Abad (Persian: نهمت آباد) is a village in Arghanj Khwa district, Badakhshan province, northeastern Afghanistan.

== Nearby villages ==
Approximately 1.09 km (0.68 mi) away from Nahmat Abad is another village in Arghanj Khwa district known as Naran Shahr Bala.
