= Aryan, Afghanistan =

Village in Badakhshan Province, Afghanistan

Aryan آريايى (Persian)
- Village
- Location in Afghanistan
- Coordinates: 37°6′48.024″N 70°51′8.784″E
- Country: Afghanistan
- Province: Badakhshan
- District: Arghanj Khwa
- Elevation: 4,072 m (13,360 ft)
- Time zone: UTC+04:30 (AST)
- Postal code: 3468

Aryan (Persian: آريايى) is a village in Arghanj Khwa district, Badakhshan province, northeastern Afghanistan.

== Nearby villages ==
Approximately 2.38 km (1.48 mi) away from Aryan is a village in Baharak district known as Zabch Gaykha.
