= Khwahan =

Khwahan may refer to:

- Khwahan District, a sub-division of Badakhshan Province in eastern Afghanistan
- Khwahan, a city and capital of the Khwahan District
