= Deh Kohneh-ye Halu Saad =

Village in Chaharmahal and Bakhtiari province, Iran

Deh Kohneh-ye Halu Saad Persian: ده كهنه هلو سعد
- Village
- Location within Iran
- Coordinates: 31°43′32″N 50°34′32″E
- Country: Iran
- Province: Chaharmahal and Bakhtiari
- County: Ardal
- District: Miankuh
- Rural District: Miankuh

Population (2016)
  - Total: 394
- Time zone: UTC+3:30 (IRST)

Deh Kohneh-ye Halu Saad (Persian: ده كهنه هلو سعد) (Note: Also romanized as Deh Kohneh-ye Halū Saʿad; also known as Deh Kohneh) is a village in, and the capital of, Miankuh Rural District in Miankuh District of Ardal County, Chaharmahal and Bakhtiari province, Iran. The previous capital of the rural district was the village of Sar Khun, now a city.

== Demographics ==
=== Ethnicity ===
The people of the village are of Lur descent and belong to the Helisadi tribe.

=== Population ===
At the time of the 2006 National Census, the village's population was 552 in 115 households. The following census in 2011 counted 580 people in 154 households. The 2016 census measured the population of the village as 394 people in 114 households.
