= Vaqfi, Chaharmahal and Bakhtiari =

Vaqfi وقفي
- Village
- Location within Iran
- Coordinates: 31°42′27″N 50°35′37″E
- Country: Iran
- Province: Chaharmahal and Bakhtiari
- County: Ardal
- Bakhsh: Miankuh
- Rural District: Miankuh

Population (2006)
  - Total: 75
- Time zone: UTC+3:30 (IRST)
  - Summer (DST): UTC+4:30 (IRDT)

Vaqfi (Persian: وقفي, also Romanized as Vaqfī) is a village in Miankuh Rural District, Miankuh District, Ardal County, Chaharmahal and Bakhtiari Province, Iran. At the 2006 census, its population was 75, in 16 families.
