= Bohlulabad, Chaharmahal and Bakhtiari =

Bohlulabad بهلول اباد
- Village
- Country: Iran
- Province: Chaharmahal and Bakhtiari
- County: Ardal
- Bakhsh: Miankuh
- Rural District: Shalil

Population (2006)
  - Total: 224
- Time zone: UTC+3:30 (IRST)
  - Summer (DST): UTC+4:30 (IRDT)

Bohlulabad (Persian: بهلول اباد, also Romanized as Bohlūlābād) is a village in Shalil Rural District, Miankuh District, Ardal County, Chaharmahal and Bakhtiari Province, Iran. At the 2006 census, its population was 224, in 41 families. The village is populated by Lurs.
