= Vaqfi =

Vaqfi (Persian: وقفي) may refer to:

- Vaqfi, Chaharmahal and Bakhtiari
- Vaqfi, Gilan
