= Banew =

Village in Badakhshan province, Afghanistan

Banew بانيو (Persian) Bānēw
- Village
- Location in Afghanistan
- Coordinates: 37°11′56″N 70°45′48″E
- Country: Afghanistan
- Province: Badakhshan
- District: Arghanj Khwa
- Elevation: 3,012 m (9,882 ft)
- Time zone: UTC+04:30 (AST)
- Postal code: 3468

Banew (Persian: بانيو) is a village in Arghanj Khwa district, Badakhshan province, northeastern Afghanistan.

== Nearby villages ==
Approximately 1.25 km (0.78 mi) away from Banew is another village in Arghanj Khwa district known as Khambayo Payen.
