= Ghala Dara Payen =

Village in Badakhshan province, Afghanistan

Ghala Dara Payen قلعه دره پاین (Persian)
- Village
- Location in Afghanistan
- Coordinates: 37°11′38.976″N 70°44′7.512″E
- Country: Afghanistan
- Province: Badakhshan
- District: Arghanj Khwa district
- Elevation: 3,872 m (12,703 ft)
- Time zone: UTC+04:30 (AST)
- Postal code: 3468

Ghala Dara Payen (Persian: قلعه دره پائین) is a village in Arghanj Khwa district, Badakhshan province, northeastern Afghanistan.

== Nearby villages ==
Approximately 0.93 km (0.58 mi) from Ghala Dara Payen is another village in Arghanj Khwa district known as Ghala Dara Bala.
