= Durak Qanbari =

Village in Chaharmahal and Bakhtiari province, Iran

Durak Qanbari Persian: دورك قنبري
- Village
- Location within Iran
- Coordinates: 31°45′31″N 50°25′36″E
- Country: Iran
- Province: Chaharmahal and Bakhtiari
- County: Ardal
- District: Miankuh
- Rural District: Shalil

Population (2016)
  - Total: 611
- Time zone: UTC+3:30 (IRST)

Durak Qanbari (Persian: دورك قنبري) (Note: Also romanized as Dūrak Qanbarī; also known as Dūrak Qanbar and Dūrak-e Qanbar) is a village in Shalil Rural District of Miankuh District in Ardal County, Chaharmahal and Bakhtiari province, Iran.

== Demographics ==
=== Ethnicity ===
The village is populated by Lurs.

=== Population ===
At the time of the 2006 National Census, the village's population was 807 in 142 households. The following census in 2011 counted 992 people in 182 households. The 2016 census measured the population of the village as 611 people in 141 households.
