= Shokrabad, Miankuh =

Village in Chaharmahal and Bakhtiari province, Iran

Shokrabad Persian: شكراباد
- Village
- Location within Iran
- Coordinates: 31°43′46″N 50°28′15″E
- Country: Iran
- Province: Chaharmahal and Bakhtiari
- County: Ardal
- District: Miankuh
- Rural District: Shalil

Population (2016)
  - Total: 823
- Time zone: UTC+3:30 (IRST)

Shokrabad (Persian: شكراباد) (Note: Also romanized as Shokrābād) is a village in, and the capital of, Shalil Rural District in Miankuh District of Ardal County, Chaharmahal and Bakhtiari province, Iran.

== Demographics ==
=== Ethnicity ===
The village is populated by Lurs.

=== Population ===
At the time of the 2006 National Census, the village's population was 797 in 145 households. The following census in 2011 counted 870 people in 191 households. The 2016 census measured the population of the village as 823 people in 209 households. It was the most populous village in its rural district.
