= Lakeow =

Lakeow دریاچه (Persian)
- Village
- Location in Afghanistan
- Coordinates: 37°9′16.236″N 70°44′13.668″E
- Country: Afghanistan
- Province: Badakhshan
- District: Arghanj Khwa
- Elevation: 3,319 m (10,889 ft)
- Time zone: UTC+04:30 (AST)
- Postal code: 3468

Lakeow (Persian: دریاچه) is a village in Arghanj Khwa district, Badakhshan province, northeastern Afghanistan.

== Nearby villages ==
Approximately 2.26 km (1.40 mi) away from Lakeow is another village in Arghanj Khwa district known as Dasht Pang.
