= Morghak =

Morghak (Persian: مرغك) may refer to:

== Afghanistan ==
- Morghak, Badakhshan, a village in Arghanj Khwa district, Badakhshan province
- Morghak, Daikundi, a village in Daikundi province

== Iran ==
- Morghak-e Olya, a village in Dehbakri rural district, Central district, Bam county, Kerman province
- Morghak-e Yek, a village in Ramjin rural district, Central district, Chaharbagh county, Alborz province
