= Emamzadeh Esmail =

Emamzadeh Esmail (Persian: امامزاده اسماعيل) may refer to:

- Emamzadeh Esmail, Chaharmahal and Bakhtiari
- Emamzadeh Esmail, Fars
- Emamzadeh Esmail, Kohgiluyeh and Boyer-Ahmad
- Emamzadeh Esmail, Qom
- Emamzadeh Esmail, Semnan
