= Ezzatabad, Chaharmahal and Bakhtiari =

Village in Chaharmahal and Bakhtiari province, Iran

Ezzatabad Persian: عزت اباد
- Village
- Location within Iran
- Coordinates: 31°43′59″N 50°27′58″E
- Country: Iran
- Province: Chaharmahal and Bakhtiari
- County: Ardal
- District: Miankuh
- Rural District: Shalil

Population (2016)
  - Total: 543
- Time zone: UTC+3:30 (IRST)

Ezzatabad (Persian: عزت اباد) (Note: Also romanized as ‘Ezzatābād) is a village in Shalil Rural District of Miankuh District in Ardal County, Chaharmahal and Bakhtiari province, Iran.

== Demographics ==
=== Ethnicity ===
The village is populated by Lurs.

=== Population ===
At the time of the 2006 National Census, the village's population was 548 in 99 households. The following census in 2011 counted 643 people in 127 households. The 2016 census measured the population of the village as 543 people in 140 households.
