= Deh-e Khalili =

Deh-e Khalili ده خليلي
- Village
- Location within Iran
- Coordinates: 31°48′46″N 50°33′02″E
- Country: Iran
- Province: Chaharmahal and Bakhtiari
- County: Ardal
- Bakhsh: Miankuh
- Rural District: Miankuh

Population (2006)
  - Total: 139
- Time zone: UTC+3:30 (IRST)
  - Summer (DST): UTC+4:30 (IRDT)

Deh-e Khalili (Persian: ده خليلي, also Romanized as Deh-e Khalīlī; also known as Gandomkār-e Khalīlī) is a village in Miankuh Rural District, Miankuh District, Ardal County, Chaharmahal and Bakhtiari Province, Iran. At the 2006 census, its population was 139, in 26 families. The village is populated by Lurs.
