= Shalil-e Sofla =

Shalil-e Sofla شليل سفلي
- Village
- Location within Iran
- Coordinates: 31°44′14″N 50°27′10″E
- Country: Iran
- Province: Chaharmahal and Bakhtiari
- County: Ardal
- Bakhsh: Miankuh
- Rural District: Shalil

Population (2006)
  - Total: 451
- Time zone: UTC+3:30 (IRST)
  - Summer (DST): UTC+4:30 (IRDT)

Shalil-e Sofla (Persian: شليل سفلي, also Romanized as Shalīl-e Soflá; also known as Shalīl-e Pā’īn) is a village in Shalil Rural District, Miankuh District, Ardal County, Chaharmahal and Bakhtiari Province, Iran. At the 2006 census, its population was 451, in 97 families. The village is populated by Lurs.
