= Emamzadeh Esmail, Chaharmahal and Bakhtiari =

Emamzadeh Esmail امامزاده اسماعيل
- Village
- Location within Iran
- Coordinates: 31°46′01″N 50°23′33″E
- Country: Iran
- Province: Chaharmahal and Bakhtiari
- County: Ardal
- Bakhsh: Miankuh
- Rural District: Shalil

Population (2006)
  - Total: 33
- Time zone: UTC+3:30 (IRST)
  - Summer (DST): UTC+4:30 (IRDT)

Emamzadeh Esmail (Persian: امامزاده اسماعيل, also Romanized as Emāmzādeh Esmā‘īl) is a village in Shalil Rural District, Miankuh District, Ardal County, Chaharmahal and Bakhtiari Province, Iran. At the 2006 census, its population was 33, in 6 families. The village is populated by Lurs.
