= Jangalak, Afghanistan =

Village in Badakhshan province, Afghanistan

Jangalak جنگلک (Persian)
- Village
- Location in Afghanistan
- Coordinates: 37°5′2.652″N 70°44′15.396″E
- Country: Afghanistan
- Province: Badakhshan
- District: Arghanj Khwa
- Elevation: 3,080 m (10,100 ft)
- Time zone: UTC+04:30 (AST)
- Postal code: 3468

Jangalak (Persian: جنگلک) is a village in Arghanj Khwa district, Badakhshan province, northeastern Afghanistan.

== Nearby villages ==
Approximately 2.48 km (1.54 mi) from Jangalak is another village in Arghanj Khwa district known as Razan.
