= Do Dargeh =

Do Dargeh دودرگِه
- Location in Afghanistan
- Coordinates: 37°51′30″N 70°16′48″E
- Country: Afghanistan
- Province: Badakhshan
- District: Khwahan
- Time zone: UTC+04:30 (AST)

Do Dargeh (Persian: دودرگِه) is a village in Khwahan district, Badakhshan province, northeastern Afghanistan.
