= Ambaran =

Ambaran امبران
- Location in Afghanistan
- Coordinates: 37°45′8″N 70°23′15″E
- Country: Afghanistan
- Province: Badakhshan Province
- District: Khwahan
- Time zone: UTC+04:30 (AST)
- Postal code: 3459

Ambaran (Persian: امبران) is a village in Khwahan district, Badakhshan province, northeastern Afghanistan.
