= Bid Khvah =

Bid Khvah بيد خواه
- Village
- Location in Afghanistan
- Coordinates: 37°52′16″N 70°13′56″E
- Country: Afghanistan
- Province: Badakhshan
- District: Khwahan
- Time zone: UTC+04:30 (AST)

Bid Khvah (Persian: بيد خواه) is a village in Khwahan district, Badakhshan province, northeastern Afghanistan.
