= Howz-e Shah-e Bala =

Howz-e Shah-e Bala حوض شاه بالا Ḩowz̠-e Shāh-e Bālā
- Village
- Location in Afghanistan
- Coordinates: 37°45′25″N 70°30′6″E
- Country: Afghanistan
- Province: Badakhshan
- District: Khwahan
- Elevation: 2,890 m (9,480 ft)
- Time zone: UTC+04:30 (AST)

Howz-e Shah-e Bala (Persian: حوض شاه بالا) is a village in Khwahan district, Badakhshan province, northeastern Afghanistan.
