= Dowlatabad, Badakhshan =

Dowlatabad دولت آباد
- village
- Location within Afghanistan
- Coordinates: 37°52′37″N 70°13′25″E
- Country: Afghanistan
- Province: Badakhshan
- District: Khwahan
- Time zone: UTC+04:30 (AST)

Dowlatabad (Persian: دولت آباد) is a village in Khwahan district, Badakhshan province, northeastern Afghanistan.
