= Kham-e Bahar =

Kham-i Bahar خمی بهار
- Location in Afghanistan
- Coordinates: 37°51′46″N 70°14′48″E
- Country: Afghanistan
- Province: Badakhshan
- District: Khwahan
- Time zone: UTC+04:30 (AST)

Kham-i Bahar (خمی بهار) is a village in Khwahan district, Badakhshan province, northeastern Afghanistan.
