= Qaidan =

Qaidan or Qayedan (Persian: قاييدان) may refer to:

- Qaidan, Chaharmahal and Bakhtiari
- Qaidan, Markazi
