= Ghala Dara Bala =

Village in Badakhshan province, Afghanistan

Ghala Dara Bala قلعه دره بالا (Persian)
- Village
- Location in Afghanistan
- Coordinates: 37°12′6.084″N 70°43′51.348″E
- Country: Afghanistan
- Province: Badakhshan
- District: Arghanj Khwa
- Elevation: 3,885 m (12,746 ft)
- Time zone: UTC+04:30 (AST)
- Postal code: 3468

Ghala Dara Bala (Persian: قلعه دره بالا) is a village in Arghanj Khwa district, Badakhshan province, northeastern Afghanistan.

== Nearby villages ==
Approximately 0.93 km (0.58 mi) away from Ghala Dara Bala is another village in Arghanj Khwa district known as Ghala Dara Payen.
