= Bostanak =

Bostanak بوستانک Bōstānak
- Location in Khwahan Afghanistan
- Coordinates: 37°49′47″N 70°18′39″E
- Country: Afghanistan
- Province: Badakhshan
- District: Khwahan
- Time zone: UTC+04:30 (AST)

Bostanak (Persian: بوستانک) is a village in Khwahan district, Badakhshan province, northeastern Afghanistan.

Bostanak is a small rural village which is located in a side of mountainous region and a gate way village to Jerw ab Creek. The distance from Khawahan centre to the village takes about a 6-hour-walk to climb the rocky mountain. The people of Bostanak are reliable on remittance which they received from their relatives that migrated to another provinces or out of the country. There are about 9 months of winter season and snow falls heavily. During winter season the people are locked and cannot move to the district centre. the local community doesn't have access to any kind of services such as roads, transport, electricity, medical services, hospitals (clinics), and safe drinking water.
