= Gandomkar-e Sofla =

Village in Chaharmahal and Bakhtiari province, Iran

Gandomkar-e Sofla Persian: گندمكارسفلي
- Village
- Location within Iran
- Coordinates: 31°48′22″N 50°33′31″E
- Country: Iran
- Province: Chaharmahal and Bakhtiari
- County: Ardal
- District: Miankuh
- Rural District: Miankuh

Population (2016)
  - Total: 725
- Time zone: UTC+3:30 (IRST)

Gandomkar-e Sofla (Persian: گندمكارسفلي) (Note: Also romanized as Gandomkār-e Soflá) is a village in Miankuh Rural District of Miankuh District in Ardal County, Chaharmahal and Bakhtiari province, Iran.

== Demographics ==
=== Ethnicity ===
The village is populated by Lurs.

=== Population ===
At the time of the 2006 National Census, the village's population was 813 in 157 households. The following census in 2011 counted 734 people in 153 households. The 2016 census measured the population of the village as 725 people in 157 households.
