= Ardal Castle =

Castle in Chaharmahal and Bakhtiari Province, Iran

- قلعه اردل
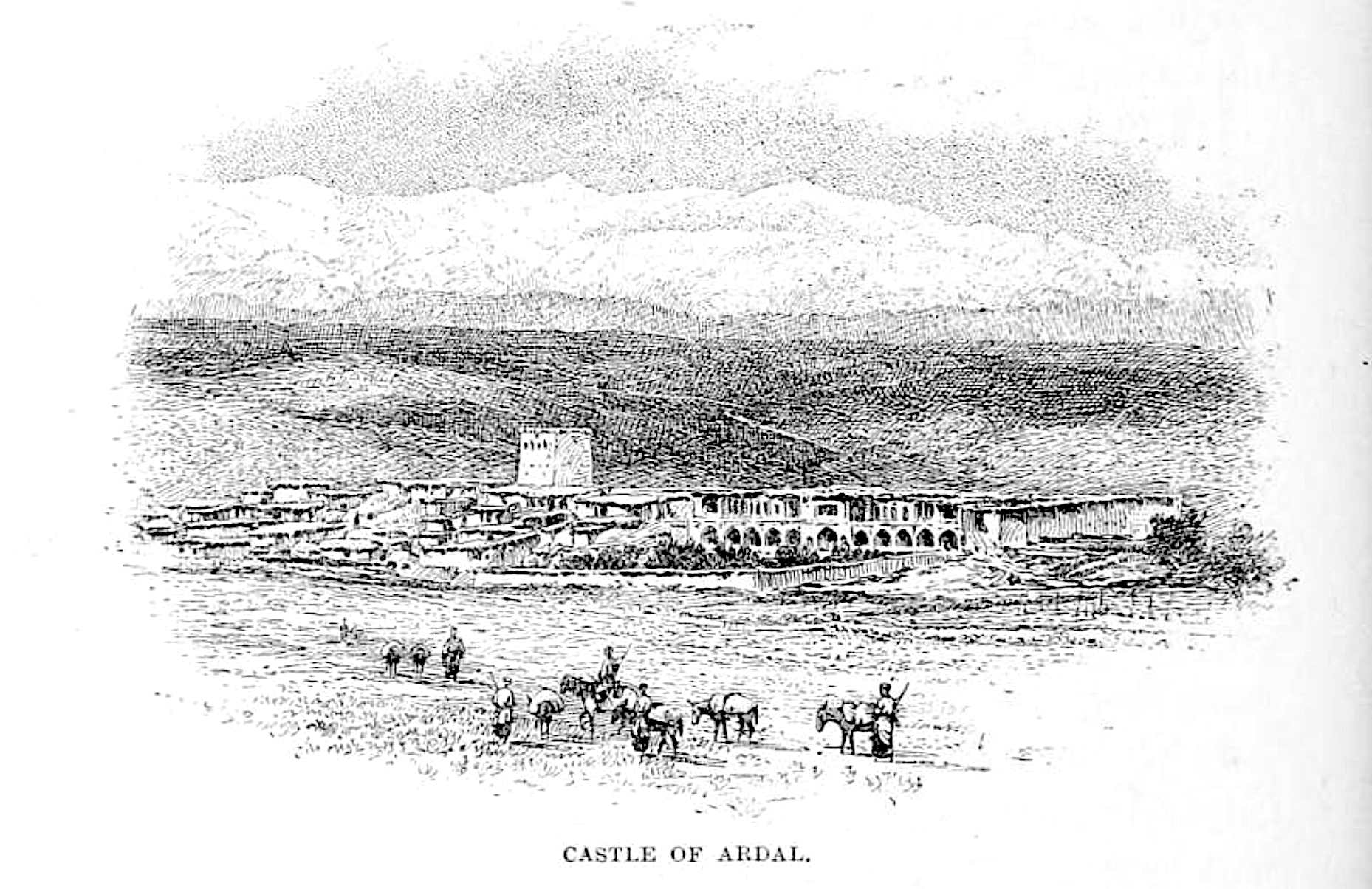
- image of Ardal Castle from 1891 book by Isabella Bird

General information
- Type: Castle
- Location: Ardal County, Iran

Ardal Castle (Persian: قلعه اردل) is a historical castle located in Ardal County in Chaharmahal and Bakhtiari Province, in Iran. The fortress dates back to the Qajar dynasty.
