= Shamsiddin =

Shamsiddin (Cyrillic: Шамсиддин) is a Central Asian masculine given name that may refer to the following notable people:

- Shamsiddin Khudoyberdiev (born 1966), Uzbek wrestler
- Shamsiddin Shanbiyev (born 1997), Russian football player
- Shamsiddin Shohin (1859–1894), Tajik poet
- Shamsiddin Vokhidov, Uzbek chess grandmaster

== See also ==
- Shamsuddin
