= Darbandak =

Darbandak دربندِک D̠anand̠ak
- Location in Khwahan Afghanistan
- Coordinates: 37°55′5″N 70°10′44″E
- Country: Afghanistan
- Province: Badakhshan
- District: Khwahan
- Time zone: UTC+04:30 (AST)

Darbandak (Persian: دربندک) is a village in Khwahan district, Badakhshan province, northeastern Afghanistan.
