= Bariki, Afghanistan =

Village in Afghanistan

Bariki باریکی Bārīkī
- Location in Afghanistan
- Coordinates: 37°48′55″N 70°19′7″E
- Country: Afghanistan
- Province: Badakhshan Province
- District: Khwahan
- Time zone: UTC+04:30 (AST)

Bariki (Persian: باریکی) is a village in Khwahan district, Badakhshan province, northeastern Afghanistan.
