= Chashma-i Tut =

Chashma-i Tut چشمهٔ توت Cheshmeh-ye Tūt
- Location in Khwahan Afghanistan
- Coordinates: 37°53′29″N 70°13′20″E
- Country: Afghanistan
- Province: Badakhshan
- District: Khwahan
- Elevation: 3,350 ft (1,020 m)
- Time zone: UTC+04:30 (AST)

Chashma-i Tut (Persian: چشمۀ توت) is a village in Khwahan district, Badakhshan province, northeastern Afghanistan.
