= Kham-e Tugh =

Kham-e Tugh خمی توغ
- Location in Afghanistan
- Coordinates: 37°50′58″N 70°15′38″E
- Country: Afghanistan
- Province: Badakhshan
- District: Khwahan
- Time zone: UTC+04:30 (AST)

Kham-e Tugh (Persian: خمی توغ) is a village in Khwahan district, Badakhshan province, northeastern Afghanistan.
