= Mohammad Asef Ahang =

- Born: 1925; Kabul, Afghanistan
- Died: 2015 (aged 89–90); Vancouver, Canada
- Occupations: Writer, historian, researcher, political activist
- Spouse: Professor Parvin Shamel
- Children: Kaveh Shafaq Ahang, Parasto Ahang Mahdavi and Ratbil Ahang

Mohammad Asef Ahang (1925; Kabul—2015 in Vancouver, Canada) was an Afghan writer, researcher, political activist, and one of the influential figures in the Third Constitutional Movement of Afghanistan. He was active for more than seven decades in the fields of Afghan history, politics, and culture and left behind numerous works.

== Biography ==
Mohammad Asef Ahang was born in 1925 in the Chubforoshi neighborhood of Chindawol, in Kabul. His father, Mirza Mahdi Khan, was the chief secretary to His Majesty Amanullah Khan and a prominent figure in the Second Constitutional Movement. His mother’s name was Amir Begum.

On September 15, 1933, Mirza Mahdi Khan was executed by hanging in the Deh Mazang prison on charges of attempting to restore Amanullah Khan, alongside several of his comrades. Mir Ghulam Muhammad Ghobar writes about this incident:

"When Mirza Mahdi Khan saw that Mohammad Wali Khan was being hanged before others, he shouted: ‘Hang me first so that I do not witness the death of such a man."

Following his father’s execution, eight-year-old Mohammad Asef and his brothers, Mohammad Younus and Mohammad Suleiman, were deprived of the right to education. However, through the effort and determination of their mother, they began traditional schooling. In his memoirs, Ahang wrote about his mother:

"My mother became a widow at a young age. Like many children whose fathers were victims of politics, my brothers and I were expelled from school. The atmosphere was so oppressive that even relatives avoided coming to our home. But my mother, who was an educated and constitutionalist woman, did not allow us to fall victim to fear and ignorance. She was determined that we continue my father’s path. Her perseverance and insight played a major role in shaping my character. I received my first lessons about the constitutionalist movement from her. Even at eighty years old, she participated in political demonstrations."

== Professional career ==
With the ascension of King Mahmud Khan (1946–1953), Ahang was able to engage in activities within non-governmental institutions. In 1944, he began working as an employee at Afghan Textile and gradually advanced from the position of clerk to the head of the factory. By 1972, he was active at the Jangalak factory in Kabul, and from 1981 to 1985, he served as the director of Afghan Textile. Following the establishment of the communist regime and due to his refusal to cooperate politically with the government, he was forced into retirement.

== Political Activity ==
During his youth, Ahang developed an interest in social issues and political struggles, beginning studies in Afghan history. On January 6, 1951, with the establishment of the “Watan Society,” Ahang joined the organization. His elder brother, Mohammad Younus, became a member of the “Neda-ye Khalq Society.” During this period, Asef Ahang changed his surname from “Mahdizadah” to “Ahang.” In 1952, following the imprisonment of the leaders of the Third Constitutional Movement, the practical leadership of the Watan Society was entrusted to Ahang. After his brothers were released from prison, he himself was arrested on the night of Eid al-Adha in 1957, along with several other constitutionalists, accused of collaborating with Abdul Malik Abdul Rahimzi. He remained imprisoned until 1963. With the end of Sardar Mohammad Daoud’s premiership in 1963, Ahang was released. From 1965 to 1968, he served as a representative of the people of Kabul in the National Assembly of Afghanistan.

== Migration ==
Following the civil wars and the fall of Dr. Najibullah’s government, Asef Ahang migrated to Peshawar and in 1995 relocated to Canada. He continued his cultural and political activities while in exile.

== Scientific and Research Activities ==
Following the Saur coup and the entry of Soviet forces into Afghanistan, Ahang refused to cooperate with the government and retired in 1985. After retirement, he devoted himself to writing historical books. With the announcement of Dr. Najibullah’s “National Reconciliation Policy,” he initiated independent political activities aimed at organizing free elections. However, due to the events of Saur 1992, he was forced to migrate. During his exile, in addition to giving interviews to media outlets, Ahang authored numerous works. Some of his publications include:

- Notes and Impressions of Old Kabul (2005), Maiwand Publishing House, Kabul
- The Worldview of a Mystic (manuscript)
- Prison Memoirs (manuscript)
- History of Various Ideologies (4 volumes, manuscript)
- Collected Articles (10 volumes, manuscript)
- Qizilbash (manuscript)
- Contemporary Figures from Amir Abdul Rahman Khan to Babrak Karmal (manuscript)
- Dari Persian: Poets and Samples of Their Poems (4 volumes, manuscript)
- Dari Persian: Satirists and Samples of Their Works (manuscript)
- Short Satirical Stories on the Political-Social Situation of the 1980s and 1990s
- A Few Lines from History and My Eyewitness Accounts (A Summary of Current Events) (1997, Germany)
- The Executioners of History Are Numerous (manuscript)
- The Hazara Movement and Shi'a in Afghanistan (Response to Yar Mohammad Kohsar) (2000, Hamburg)
- A Response to the Accusations of Nabi Azimi (2000, Publisher: Dr. Murad Ali Roshandel, Germany)
- History of Afghanistan; Notes and Impressions (2020, Vajeh Publishing, Kabul)

== Personal life ==
Asef Ahang was married to Professor Parvin Shamel. The marriage resulted in three children named Kaveh Shafaq Ahang, Parasto Ahang Mahdavi, and Ratbil Ahang.

== Death ==
Mohammad Asef Ahang died in 2015 at the age of 90 in Vancouver, Canada.

== Mohammad Asef Ahang Foundation ==
The Mohammad Asef Ahang Foundation is a cultural, social, and non-governmental organization. The initial activities of the Ahang Foundation began in 2021. Alongside publishing and collecting the published and unpublished works of Mohammad Asef Ahang, a critical researcher and historian of Afghanistan, the foundation supports various cultural sectors within the country. Since its inception, the Ahang Foundation has launched various cultural support programs. One of its initiatives, titled "Who is capable is the one who is knowledgeable," aims to promote a culture of reading and support book enthusiasts.
