= Bohlulabad =

Bohlulabad or Bahlulabad (Persian: بهلول اباد) may refer to:

- Bohlulabad, Chaharmahal and Bakhtiari
- Bohlulabad, Razavi Khorasan
- Bohlulabad, Poldasht, West Azerbaijan Province
- Bahlulabad, Urmia, West Azerbaijan Province
