= Naran Shahr Bala =

Village in Badakhshan, Afghanistan

Naran Shahr Bala ناران شهر بالا (Persian)
- Village
- Location in Afghanistan
- Coordinates: 37°9′57.564″N 70°47′16.368″E
- Country: Afghanistan
- Province: Badakhshan
- District: Arghanj Khwa
- Elevation: 3,919 m (12,858 ft)
- Time zone: UTC+04:30 (AST)
- Postal code: 3468

Naran Shahr Bala (Persian: ناران شهر بالا) is a village in Arghanj Khwa district, Badakhshan province, north-eastern Afghanistan.

== Nearby villages ==
Approximately 0.94 km (0.58 mi) away from Naran Shahr Bala is another village in Arghanj Khwa district known as Now Abad.
