= Jerwu Bala =

Jerwu Bala جرووِ نالا
- Location in Afghanistan
- Coordinates: 37°48′57″N 70°27′8″E
- Country: Afghanistan
- Province: Badakhshan
- District: Khwahan
- Time zone: UTC+04:30 (AST)

Jerwu Bala (Persian: جرووِ بالا) is a village in Khwahan district, Badakhshan province, northeastern Afghanistan.
