= Lal Margh =

Lal Margh لال مَرغ (Persian) Lāl Margh
- Village
- Location in Afghanistan
- Coordinates: 37°46′5″N 70°27′30″E
- Country: Afghanistan
- Province: Badakhshan
- District: Khwahan

Area
  - Total: 1.3 km^{2} (0.50 sq mi)
- Elevation: 2,562 m (8,406 ft)
- Time zone: UTC+04:30 (AST)

Lal Margh (Persian: لال مَرغ) is a village in Khwahan district, Badakhshan province, northeastern Afghanistan.
