= Khambayo Payen =

Khambayo Payen خامبایو پاین (Persian) Khambayo Pa'in
- Village
- Location in Afghanistan
- Coordinates: 37°11′12.588″N 70°45′57.888″E
- Country: Afghanistan
- Province: Badakhshan
- District: Arghanj Khwa
- Elevation: 3,406 m (11,175 ft)
- Time zone: UTC+04:30 (AST)
- Postal code: 3468

Khambayo Payen (Persian: خامبایو پاین), also known as Khambayo Pa'in, is a village in Arghanj Khwa district, Badakhshan province, northeastern Afghanistan.

== Nearby villages ==
Approximately 1.03 km (0.64 mi) away from Khambayo Payen is another village in Arghanj Khwa district known as Seni Mayet.
