= Kamar, Afghanistan =

Kamar
- Village
- Location in Afghanistan
- Coordinates: 37°55′10″N 70°11′37″E
- Country: Afghanistan
- Province: Badakhshan
- District: Khwahan
- Elevation: 880 m (2,890 ft)
- Time zone: UTC+04:30 (AST)

Kamar is a village in Khwahan district, Badakhshan province, northeastern Afghanistan.

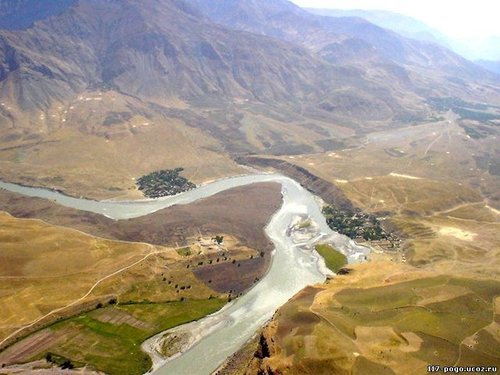
View of Khwahan district and two of its villages, Kamar and Kaji, as well as the Panj river.
