= Chosnukel =

Chosnukel چوس نوکيل Chosnūkēl
- Location in Khwahan Afghanistan
- Coordinates: 37°44′31″N 70°20′6″E
- Country: Afghanistan
- Province: Badakhshan
- District: Khwahan
- Time zone: UTC+04:30 (AST)

Chosnukel (Persian: چوس نوکیل) is a village in Khwahan district, Badakhshan province, northeastern Afghanistan.
