= Chetgah =

Chetgah چدگِه
- Location in Afghanistan
- Coordinates: 37°44′4″N 70°24′39″E
- Country: Afghanistan
- Province: Badakhshan
- District: Khwahan
- Time zone: UTC+04:30 (AST)

Chetgah (Persian: چدگِه) is a village in Khwahan district, Badakhshan province, northeastern Afghanistan.
