= Ghalil =

Ghalil غليل
- Village
- Location in Khwahan, Afghanistan
- Coordinates: 37°45′0″N 70°23′18″E
- Country: Afghanistan
- Province: Badakhshan
- District: Khwahan
- Time zone: UTC+04:30 (AST)
- Postal code: 3459

Ghalil (Persian: غلیل) is a village in Khwahan district, Badakhshan province, northeastern Afghanistan.

== See also ==
- Badakhshan Province
