= Joy-i Saluk =

Joy-i Saluk جوی سلوک
- Location in Afghanistan
- Coordinates: 37°45′29″N 70°23′27″E
- Country: Afghanistan
- Province: Badakhshan
- District: Khwahan
- Time zone: UTC+04:30 (AST)

Joy-i Saluk (Persian: جوی سلوک) is a village in Khwahan district, Badakhshan province, northeastern Afghanistan.
