= Bagh-e Sangak =

Bagh-e Sangak باغ سنگک
- Location in Khwahan Afghanistan
- Coordinates: 37°53′19″N 70°13′10″E
- Country: Afghanistan
- Province: Badakhshan
- District: Khwahan
- Time zone: UTC+04:30 (AST)

Bagh-e Sangak (Persian: باغ سنگک) is a village in Khwahan district, Badakhshan province, northeastern Afghanistan.
