= Bed-e Khva =

Bed Khvah (2) (۲)بید خواه
- Location in Afghanistan
- Coordinates: 37°45′51″N 70°22′54″E
- Country: Afghanistan
- Province: Badakhshan Province
- District: Khwahan
- Time zone: UTC+04:30 (AST)

Bed Khvah (2) (Persian: (۲)بید خواه) is a village in Khwahan district, Badakhshan province, northeastern Afghanistan.
