= Howz-e Shah-e Pa'in =

Howz-e Shah-e Pa'in حوض شاه پايين Ḩowẕ-e Shāh-e Pā'īn
- Village
- Location in Afghanistan
- Coordinates: 37°45′48″N 70°29′8″E
- Country: Afghanistan
- Province: Badakhshan
- District: Khwahan
- Time zone: UTC+04:30 (AST)

Howz-e Shah-e Pa'in (Persian: حوض شاه پايين) is a village in Khwahan district, Badakhshan province, northeastern Afghanistan.
