= Drel =

Drel دريل
- Location in Afghanistan
- Coordinates: 37°46′8″N 70°28′31″E
- Country: Afghanistan
- Province: Badakhshan
- District: Khwahan
- Time zone: UTC+04:30 (AST)

Drel (Persian: دريل) is a village in Khwahan district, Badakhshan province, northeastern Afghanistan.
