= Khengan =

Khengan خِنگان
- Location in Afghanistan
- Coordinates: 37°43′39″N 70°21′50″E
- Country: Afghanistan
- Province: Badakhshan
- District: Khwahan
- Time zone: UTC+04:30 (AST)

Khengan (Persian: خِنگار) is a village in Khwahan district, Badakhshan province, northeastern Afghanistan.
