= Kowl Darrah =

Kowl Darrah کولدره Kowl Darreh
- Village
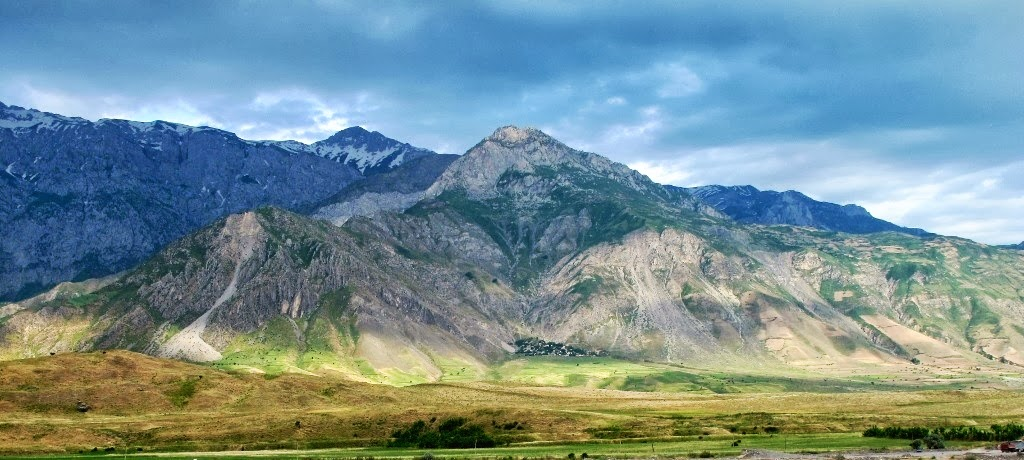
- Perspective of Kowl Darrah

- Kowl Darrah's location in Afghanistan
- Coordinates: 37°55′25″N 70°14′39″E
- Country: Afghanistan
- Province: Badakhshan
- District: Khwahan
- Elevation: 1,300 m (4,300 ft)
- Time zone: UTC+04:30 (AST)

Kowl Darrah (Persian: کولدره), also known as Kowl Darreh, is a village in Khwahan district, Badakhshan province, northeastern Afghanistan.
