= Jerwu Pa'in =

Jerwu Pa'in جرووِ پايين
- Village
- Location in Afghanistan
- Coordinates: 37°50′26″N 70°24′23″E
- Country: Afghanistan
- Province: Badakhshan
- District: Khwahan
- Time zone: UTC+04:30 (AST)

Jerwu Pa'in (Persian: جرووِ پايين) is a village in Khwahan district, Badakhshan province, northeastern Afghanistan.
