= Kheyrabad, Khwahan District =

Kheyrabad خير آباد
- Location in Afghanistan
- Coordinates: 37°51′26″N 70°13′7″E
- Country: Afghanistan
- Province: Badakhshan
- District: Khwahan
- Elevation: 1,000 m (3,300 ft)
- Time zone: UTC+04:30 (AST)

Kheyrabad (Persian: خير آباد) is a village in Khwahan district, Badakhshan province, northeastern Afghanistan.
