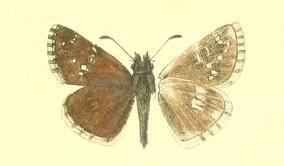

Scientific classification
- Domain: Eukaryota
- Kingdom: Animalia
- Phylum: Arthropoda
- Class: Insecta
- Order: Lepidoptera
- Family: Hesperiidae
- Genus: Pyrgus
- Species: P. darwazicus

Binomial name
- Pyrgus darwazicus Grum-Grshimailo, 1890

Synonyms
- Hesperia alpina var. subnurina Reverdin, 1933

= Pyrgus darwazicus =

Species of skipper butterfly genus Pyrgus

Pyrgus darwazicus is a butterfly of the family Hesperiidae. It is found in Ghissar, Alai, Darvaz and the western Pamirs.

== Subspecies ==
- Pyrgus darwazicus darwazicus
- Pyrgus darwazicus distinctus de Jong, 1979 (western Pamirs)
- Pyrgus darwazicus celsimontius Kauffmann, 1952 (south-western Pamirs, Badahsan, north-eastern Afghanistan)
