= Pari Kham =

Pari Kham پریخم Parī Kham
- Location in Khwahan Afghanistan
- Coordinates: 37°53′35″N 70°15′42″E
- Country: Afghanistan
- Province: Badakhshan
- District: Khwahan
- Time zone: + 4.30

Pari Kham (Persian: پریخم) is a village in the Khwahan District of Badakhshan in north-eastern Afghanistan.

== See also ==
- Badakhshan Province
