= Shamsiddin Shohin =

Shamsiddin Shohin (also spelled Shahin; 1859–1894) was a Tajik poet and satirist in the Emirate of Bukhara.

== Biography ==
His father, Mullah Amān, originally came from the Khatlān region (present-day Kulāb). In his youth, he left his homeland to pursue education, studying in Samarkand and later continuing his studies in Bukhara, where he completed his education at a madrasa. After graduating, he got married in Bukhara and taught at one of the madrasas there for some time.

From a young age, Shamsiddin Shāhin demonstrated extraordinary talent in reading and writing. As he later recounted, he began composing poetry at eight or nine while still in school. By the age of seven, Shamsiddin Makhdoom Shāhin had memorized the entire Divan of Hafez.

After finishing school, his father noticed his son's beautiful and clear handwriting and apprenticed him as a scribe. Within two or three years, Shāhin mastered the art of calligraphy and composition.

== Education ==
Around fourteen or fifteen, Shamsiddin Shāhin enrolled in a madrasa to continue his education. There, he displayed exceptional talent and abilities. However, his life during this time was extremely difficult financially. His father, now elderly, struggled to support the family and pay for his son's education.

Despite these challenges, some scholars and officials of the time, recognizing the poet's extraordinary talent and dedication to learning, occasionally provided him with financial assistance. Shāhin himself copied rare books and manuscripts, earning enough to make ends meet and support his impoverished family.

After graduating from the madrasa, Shohin struggled to find a suitable job. For a time, he served as an imam in mosques, but he found this work, which often involved attending various ceremonies like a mendicant, distasteful.

Shāhin had studied in the schools and madrasas of Bukhara, and after graduating, he was appointed as an imam in one of the mahallas of Bukhara. In 1885, he began working as a scribe for Amir Abdul Ahad’s official, Abdulqādir Parvānachi. Parvānachi, recognizing Shāhin’s talent and knowledge, greatly respected him and provided him with financial support. During this period, Shāhin also cared for his family, who had been left without a provider.

== Family ==
In 1887, Shāhin married the daughter of Abdulqādir Parvānachi (Абдулқодири Парвоначӣ), who was the governor of Shuroobod at the time. His wife died 10 months after. His poem "Laily and Majnun" is in remembrance of his wife.

== Toponyms ==
The Shuroobod District, where his wife's father was governor, was renamed in his honour.

== Sources ==
- Grassi, Evelin (2000). "Šāhin". In Yarshater, Ehsan (ed.). Encyclopædia Iranica (Online ed.). Encyclopædia Iranica Foundation. ISBN 978-0-933273-37-5.
