= Ruyanzar =

Ruyanzar روینزار
- Location in Afghanistan
- Coordinates: 37°50′4″N 70°25′36″E
- Country: Afghanistan
- Province: Badakhshan
- District: Khwahan
- Time zone: +4.30

Ruyanzar Persian: روینزار is a Village in north-eastern Afghanistan. It is located in Khwahan District to Badakhshan province.

== See also ==
- Badakhshan Province
