= Sayed Abad =

Sayedabad سیدآباد
- Location in Afghanistan
- Coordinates: 37°50′15″N 70°13′24″E
- Country: Afghanistan
- Province: Badakhshan
- District: Khwahan
- Time zone: + 4.30

Sayedabad Persian: سیدآباد is a village in north-eastern Afghanistan. It is located in Khwahan District in Badakhshan province.

== See also ==
- Badakhshan Province
