= Khwahan, Afghanistan =

Khawan خواهان Khwāhān
- Town
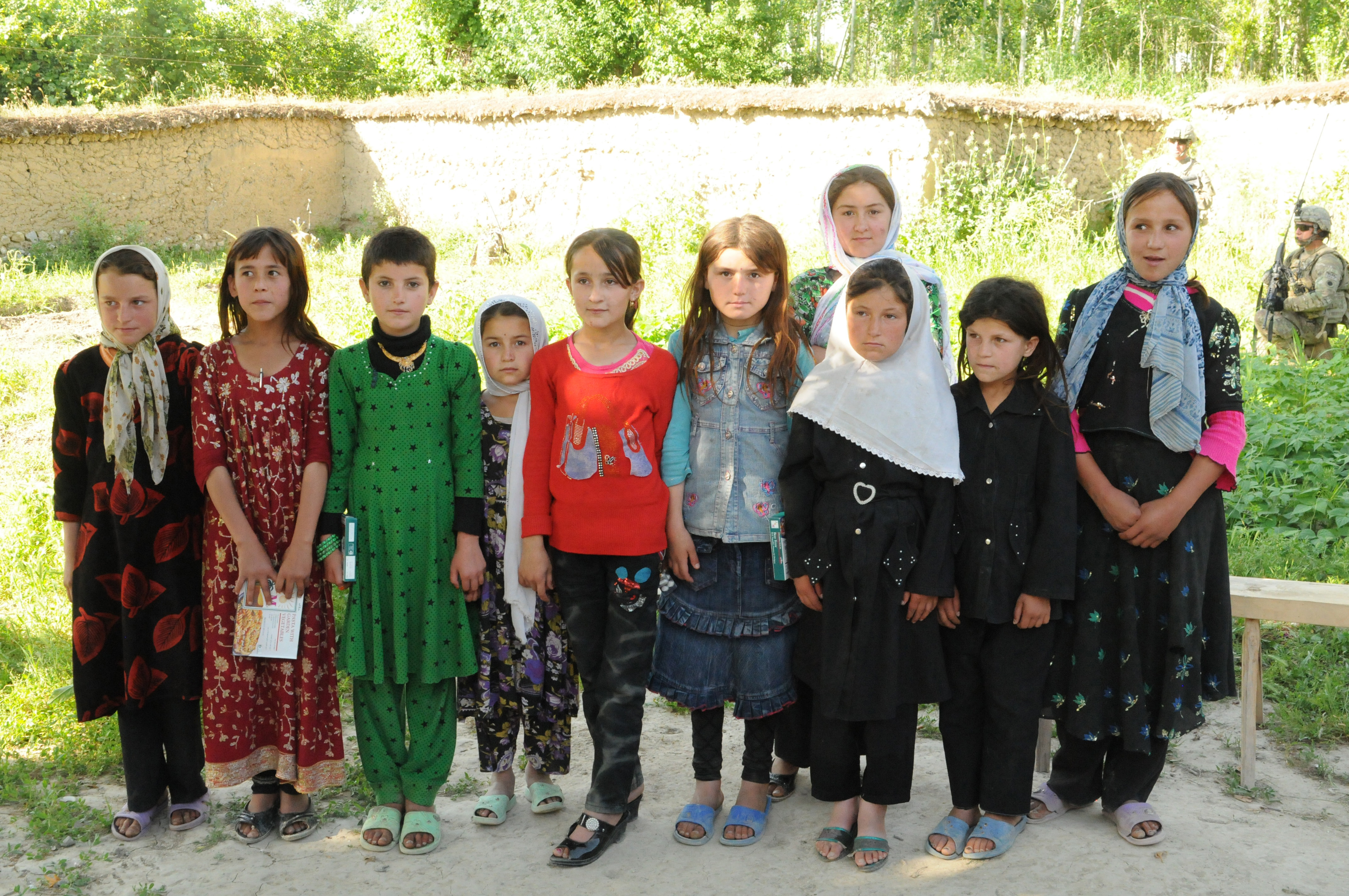
- Young Khwahan girls gather at the medical facility in Khwahan, Badakhshan Province, on 3 June 2012.

- Location of Khwahan in Afghanistan
- Coordinates: 37°53′19″N 70°13′10″E
- Country: Afghanistan
- Province: Badakhshan
- District: Khwahan
- Elevation: 3,410 ft (1,040 m)
- Time zone: +4.30
  - Summer (DST): +4.30
- Postal code: 3459

Khwahan (Dari: خواهان) is a town (and a fort) and the capital of Khwahan District, Badakhshan Province, northern Afghanistan. It is located on the left bank of the Panj River, in the subregion of Darwaz.

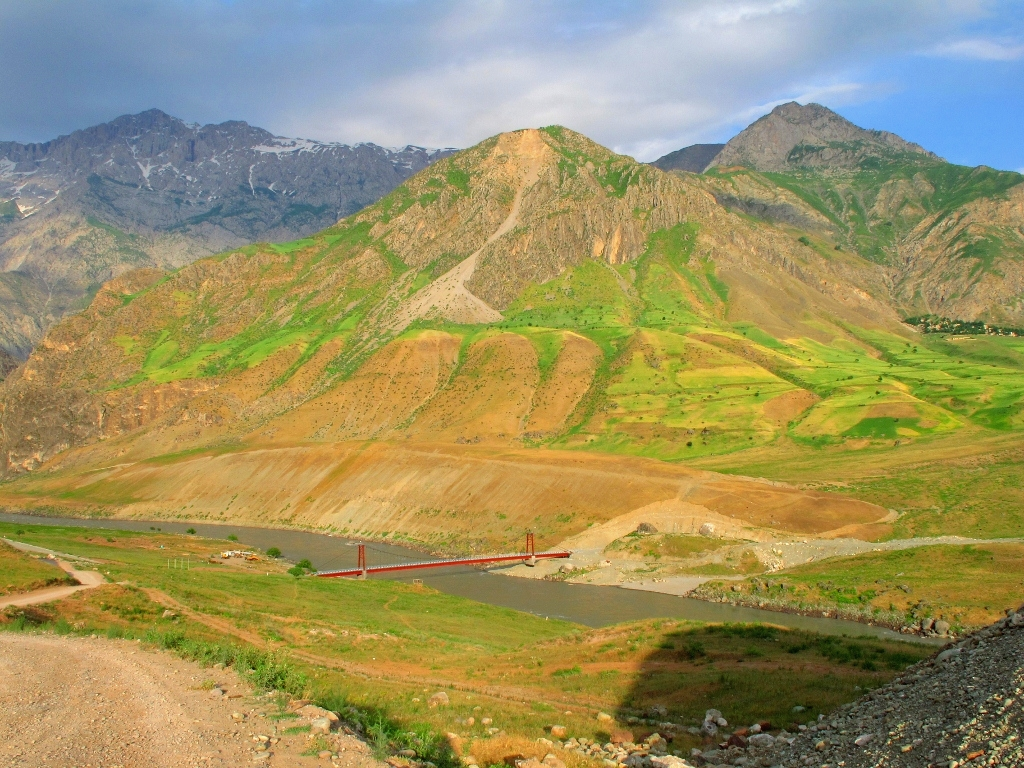
Friendship Bridge between Khwahan District (Afghanistan) and Shuro-obod District (Tajikistan)

== History ==
After Alexander the Great conquered the Persian Empire, the area came under the rule of the Greco-Bactrian king Euthydemus I and his son Demetrius I.

The village has a fort called Qala Khwahan. The fort is made of mud, in the shape of a square with three bastions on each face, with a capacity of 500 to 600 individuals. It is similar to most other forts in the area. For about two miles in each direction is cultivated land.

The village contained roughly 160 houses around the turn of the 20th century.

The inhabitants of the area speak Dari Persian and are Sunni Muslim. They engage in agriculture, growing buckwheat, red and white barley, sesame, zucchini, corn, mung beans, peas, beans and potatoes.

== Geography ==
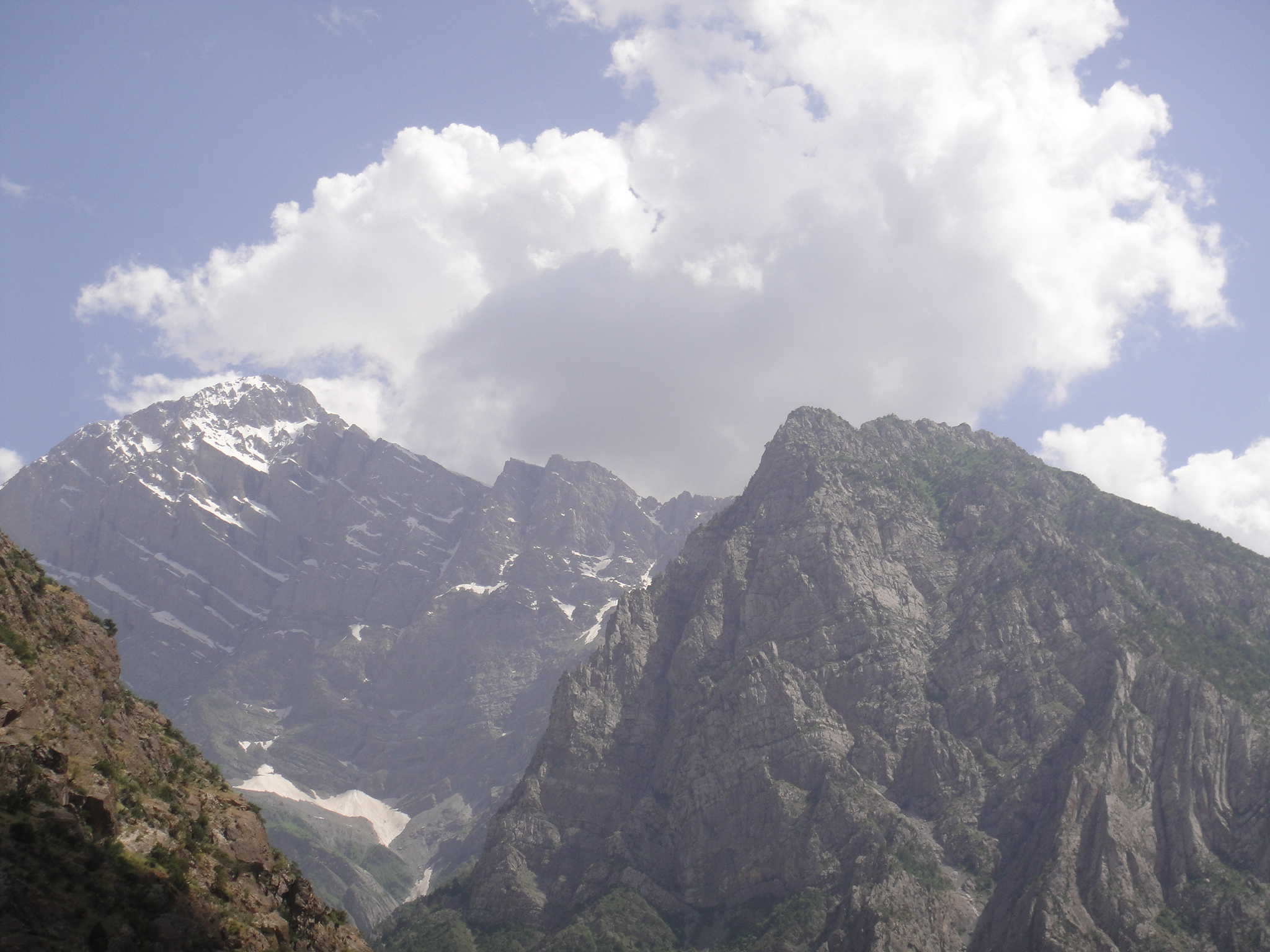
Koh-e Labgard

The area is mountainous, with Kuh-e Kallat a prominent mountain in the district. This peak is 4090 meters high above sea level. The town sits on the Panj River and is one of very few Afghan towns with Tajikistan to its south. Road access is to Kulob, Tajikistan.

=== Climate ===
Khwahan’s climate is humid continental (Köppen Dsb), with an annual mean temperature of 9.4 °C (48.9 °F). September is the driest month, with 19 millimetres (0.7 in) of rain. In May, the precipitation reaches its peak, with an average of 172 millimetres (6.8 in).

Climate data for Khwahan
Month	Jan	Feb	Mar	Apr	May	Jun	Jul	Aug	Sep	Oct	Nov	Dec	Year
Record high °C (°F)	18.6 (65.5)	21.4 (70.5)	28.3 (82.9)	30.8 (87.4)	36.8 (98.2)	38.6 (101.5)	39.6 (103.3)	38.2 (100.8)	33.7 (92.7)	31.1 (88.0)	25.4 (77.7)	19.2 (66.6)	39.6 (103.3)
Mean daily maximum °C (°F)	2.9 (37.2)	4.5 (40.1)	10.3 (50.5)	15.8 (60.4)	20.6 (69.1)	24.7 (76.5)	27.6 (81.7)	27.2 (81.0)	23.6 (74.5)	17.3 (63.1)	10.0 (50.0)	4.6 (40.3)	15.8 (60.4)
Daily mean °C (°F)	−3.1 (26.4)	−1.1 (30.0)	4.2 (39.6)	9.1 (48.4)	13.7 (56.7)	17.9 (64.2)	21.2 (70.2)	21.0 (69.8)	17.2 (63.0)	10.8 (51.4)	3.5 (38.3)	−2.0 (28.4)	9.4 (48.9)
Mean daily minimum °C (°F)	−9.0 (15.8)	−6.7 (19.9)	−1.9 (28.6)	2.3 (36.1)	6.8 (44.2)	11.0 (51.8)	14.7 (58.5)	14.7 (58.5)	10.7 (51.3)	4.3 (39.7)	−3.1 (26.4)	−8.5 (16.7)	2.9 (37.3)
Record low °C (°F)	−23.9 (−11.0)	−25.0 (−13.0)	−25.5 (−13.9)	−14.2 (6.4)	−4.6 (23.7)	4.5 (40.1)	7.7 (45.9)	2.4 (36.3)	−0.5 (31.1)	−7.1 (19.2)	−25.7 (−14.3)	−22.6 (−8.7)	−25.7 (−14.3)
Average precipitation mm (inches)	92 (3.6)	117 (4.6)	139 (5.5)	152 (6.0)	172 (6.8)	85 (3.3)	33 (1.3)	20 (0.8)	19 (0.7)	52 (2.0)	75 (3.0)	83 (3.3)	1,039 (40.9)
Source: Climate-Data.org, NASA Power (Extremes)
