= Sel Don =

Sel Don سیل دون
- Location in Afghanistan
- Coordinates: 37°45′4″N 70°24′54″E
- Country: Afghanistan
- Province: Badakhshan
- District: Khwahan
- Time zone: + 4.30

Sel Don Persian: سیل دون is a Village in north-eastern Afghanistan . It is located in Khwahan District to Badakhshan province.

== See also ==
- Badakhshan Province
