= Safed Sangan =

Safed Sangan سفید سنگان
- Location in Afghanistan
- Coordinates: 37°47′2″N 70°23′5″E
- Country: Afghanistan
- Province: Badakhshan
- District: Khwahan
- Time zone: + 4.30

Safed Sangan Persian: سفید سنگان is a village in north-eastern Afghanistan . It is located in Khwahan District to Badakhshan province.

== See also ==
- Badakhshan Province
