= Ardal =

City in Chaharmahal and Bakhtiari province, Iran

Ardal Persian: اردل
- City
- Location within Iran
- Coordinates: 31°59′55″N 50°39′44″E
- Country: Iran
- Province: Chaharmahal and Bakhtiari
- County: Ardal
- District: Central

Population (2016)
  - Total: 10,113
- Time zone: UTC+3:30 (IRST)

Ardal (Persian: اردل) (Note: Also romanized as Ardel) is a city in the Central District of Ardal County, Chaharmahal and Bakhtiari province, Iran, serving as capital of both the county and the district.

== Demographics ==
=== Ethnicity ===
The city is populated by Lurs.\

=== Population ===
At the time of the 2006 National Census, the city's population was 8,162 in 1,767 households. The following census in 2011 counted 8,992 people in 2,025 households. The 2016 census measured the population of the city as 10,113 people in 2,642 households.

== Climate ==
Climate data for Ardal (2009-2013 normals)
Month	Jan	Feb	Mar	Apr	May	Jun	Jul	Aug	Sep	Oct	Nov	Dec	Year
Mean daily maximum °C (°F)	10 (50)	10 (50)	15 (59)	19 (66)	25 (77)	32 (90)	36 (97)	35 (95)	31 (88)	24 (75)	15 (59)	11 (52)	22 (72)
Daily mean °C (°F)	4 (39)	4 (39)	9 (48)	13 (55)	18 (64)	24 (75)	28 (82)	27 (81)	23 (73)	17 (63)	9 (48)	5 (41)	15 (59)
Mean daily minimum °C (°F)	−2 (28)	−1 (30)	3 (37)	7 (45)	11 (52)	16 (61)	20 (68)	19 (66)	15 (59)	10 (50)	4 (39)	−1 (30)	8 (47)
Average precipitation mm (inches)	63 (2.5)	77 (3.0)	63 (2.5)	69 (2.7)	12 (0.5)	0 (0)	0 (0)	1 (0.0)	0 (0)	10 (0.4)	111 (4.4)	76 (3.0)	482 (19)
Average relative humidity (%)	55	59	45	49	39	24	21	21	22	30	53	53	39
Mean monthly sunshine hours	207	191	227	214	253	321	331	318	303	266	198	222	3,051
Source: Chaharmahalmet
