= Namaz-e Pas =

Namaz-e Pas نماز پس
- Location in Afghanistan
- Coordinates: 37°52′13″N 70°11′21″E
- Country: Afghanistan
- Province: Badakhshan
- District: Khwahan
- Elevation: 890 m (2,920 ft)
- Time zone: + 4.30

Namaz-e Pas Persian: نماز پس is a Village in north-eastern Afghanistan . It is located in Khwahan District to Badakhshan province.

== See also ==
- Badakhshan Province
