= Sar-e Biland =

Sar-e Baland سرِ بلند
- Location in Afghanistan
- Coordinates: 37°45′31″N 70°22′44″E
- Country: Afghanistan
- Province: Badakhshan
- District: Khwahan
- Time zone: + 4.30

Sar-e Biland Persian: سرِ بلند is a village in north-eastern Afghanistan. It is located in Khwahan District in Badakhshan province.

== See also ==
- Badakhshan Province
