= Zarich, Khwahan =

Zarich زریچ
- Location in Afghanistan
- Coordinates: 37°45′20″N 70°26′56″E
- Country: Afghanistan
- Province: Badakhshan
- District: Khwahan
- Time zone: + 4.30

Zarich Persian: زریچ is a village in north-eastern Afghanistan. It is located in Khwahan District in Badakhshan province.

== See also ==
- Badakhshan Province
