= Sang Ab =

Sang Ab سنگ آب
- Location in Afghanistan
- Coordinates: 37°53′03″N 70°13′18″E
- Country: Afghanistan
- Province: Badakhshan
- District: Khwahan
- Time zone: + 4.30

Sang Ab Persian: سنگ آب is a village in north-eastern Afghanistan. It is located in Khwahan District in Badakhshan province.

== See also ==
- Badakhshan Province
