= Shing Darrah =

Shing Darreh شینگ دره
- Location in Khwahan Afghanistan
- Coordinates: 37°45′19″N 70°21′10″E
- Country: Afghanistan
- Province: Badakhshan
- District: Khwahan
- Time zone: + 4.50

Shing Darreh Persian: شینگ دره is a village in Khwahan Badakhshan Province in north-eastern Afghanistan.

== See also ==
- Badakhshan Province
