= Mushuk March =

Mushuk March موشک مارچ
- Location in Afghanistan
- Coordinates: 37°42′59″N 70°27′23″E
- Country: Afghanistan
- Province: Badakhshan
- District: Khwahan
- Time zone: + 4.30

Mushuk March Persian: موشک مارچ is a Village in north-eastern Afghanistan . It is located in Khwahan District to Badakhshan province.

== See also ==
- Badakhshan Province
