= Shahr-i Now =

Shahr-i Now شهر نو
- Location in Afghanistan
- Coordinates: 37°53′38″N 70°12′36″E
- Country: Afghanistan
- Province: Badakhshan
- District: Khwahan
- Elevation: 1,040 m (3,410 ft)
- Time zone: + 4.30

Shahr-i Now Persian: شهر نو is a town in north-eastern Afghanistan . It is located in Khwahan District to Badakhshan province.

== See also ==
- Badakhshan Province
