= Qaleh Darvish =

Village in Chaharmahal and Bakhtiari, Iran

Qaleh Darvish قلعه درويش
- Village
- Location within Iran
- Coordinates: 32°06′28″N 50°30′47″E
- Country: Iran
- Province: Chaharmahal and Bakhtiari
- County: Ardal
- Bakhsh: Central
- Rural District: Poshtkuh

Population (2006)
  - Total: 595
- Time zone: UTC+3:30 (IRST)
  - Summer (DST): UTC+4:30 (IRDT)

Qaleh Darvish (Persian: قلعه درويش, also Romanized as Qal‘eh Darvīsh and Qal‘eh-ye Darvīsh; also known as Ghal‘eh Darvish) is a village in Poshtkuh Rural District, in the Central District of Ardal County, Chaharmahal and Bakhtiari Province, Iran. At the 2006 census, its population was 595, in 125 families.
