= Zardu =

Zardu زردو
- Location in Afghanistan
- Coordinates: 37°45′21″N 70°22′50″E
- Country: Afghanistan
- Province: Badakhshan
- District: Khwahan
- Time zone: + 4.30

Zardu Persian: زردو is a village in north-eastern Afghanistan. It is located in Khwahan District, Badakhshan province.

== See also ==
- Badakhshan Province
