= Tejkel =

Tejkel تیجکیل
- Location in Afghanistan
- Coordinates: 37°44′58″N 70°22′32″E
- Country: Afghanistan
- Province: Badakhshan Province
- District: Khwahan
- Time zone: + 4.30
- Postal code: 3459

Tejkel (Persian: تیجکیل) is a dene in Khwahan Badakhshan Province in north-eastern Afghanistan.

== See also ==
- Badakhshan Province
