= Khwahan District =

Khwahan شهرستان خواهان (Dari) خواهان ولسوالی (Pashto)
- District
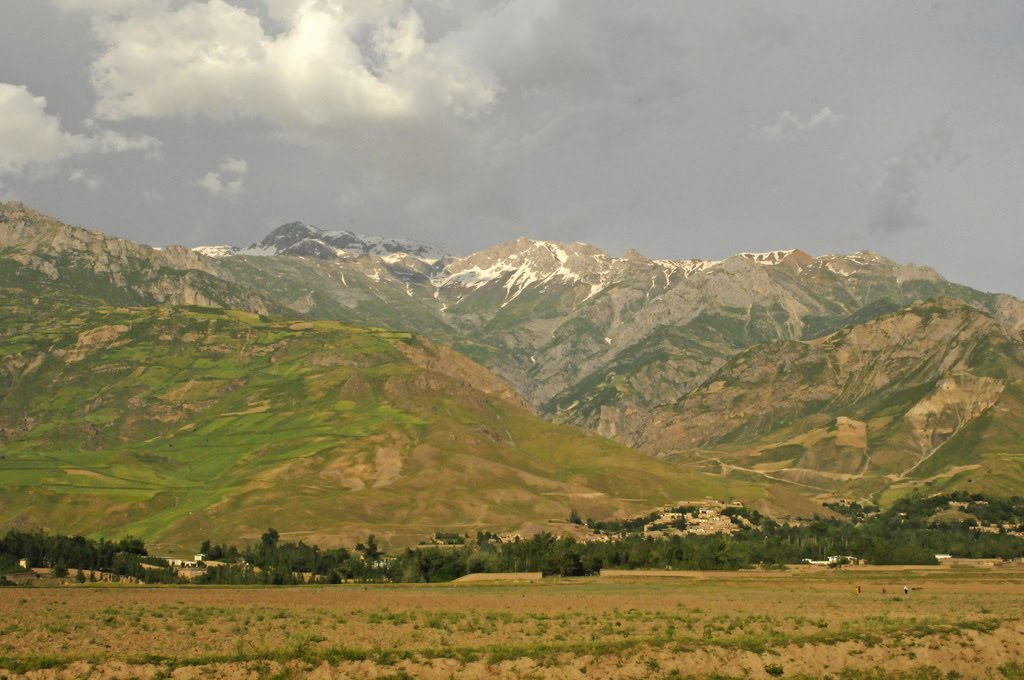
- Khwahan

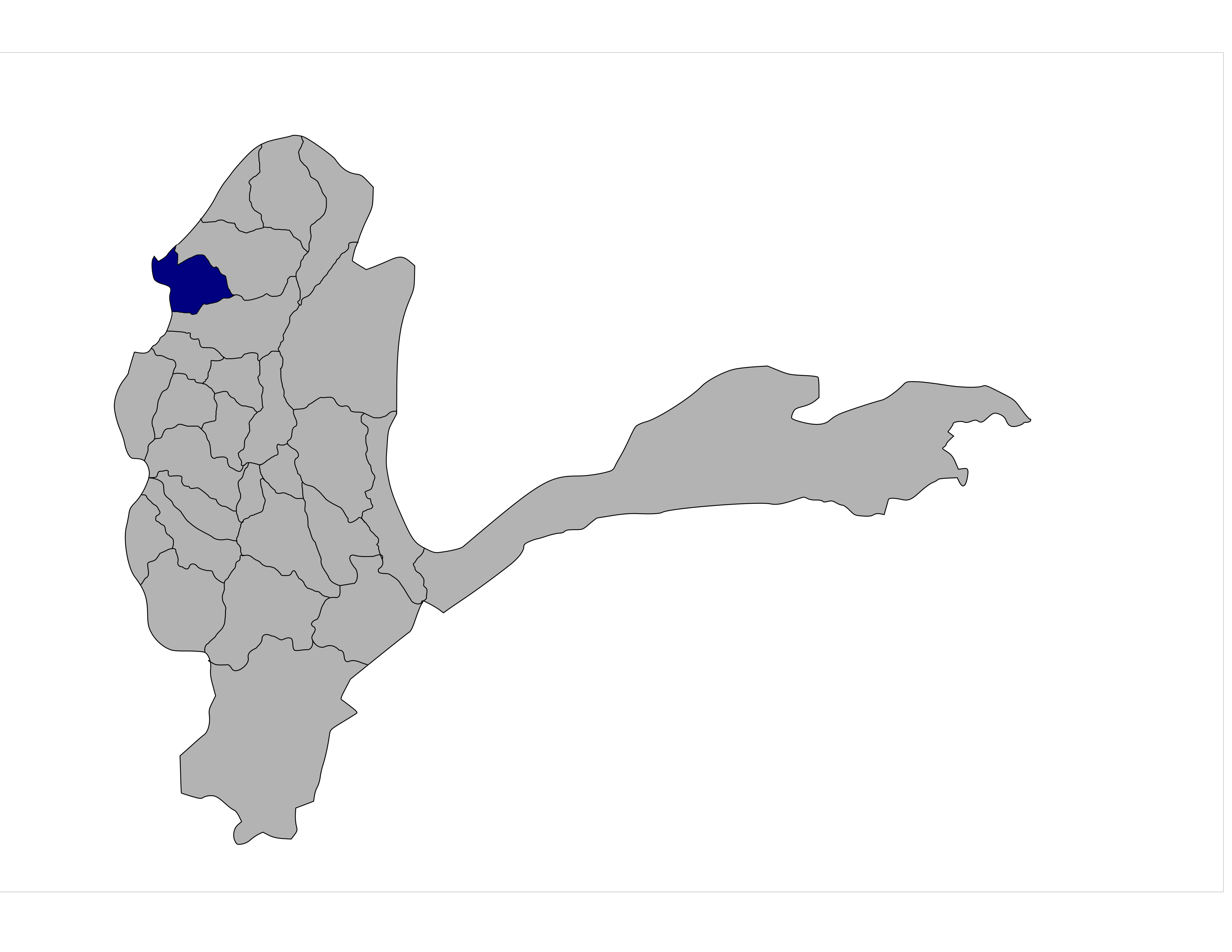

- Location in Afghanistan
- Coordinates: 37°53′19″N 70°13′10″E
- Country: Afghanistan
- Province: Badakhshan
- Capital: Khwahan

Government
  - Governor: Mohammad Ofran

Area
  - Total: 80 km^{2} (31 sq mi)
- Elevation: 4,300 m (14,100 ft)

Population (2012)
  - Total: 27,000
  - Density: 337.5/km^{2} (874/sq mi)
  - Ethnicities: Tajiks
  - Languages: Dari
- Time zone: UTC+4:30 (AST)
- Postal code: 3459
- ISO 3166 code: AF, BDS, KWH

Khwahan (Dari: شهرستان خواهان; Pashto: خواهان ولسوالی) is one of the 28 districts of Badakhshan province, located in northeastern Afghanistan. The district capital is Khwahan. The district borders Raghistan to the southwest, Kuf Ab to the northeast, the Panj river to the northwest, and Shamsiddin Shohin district, located in the Khatlon region of Tajikistan to the west.

== Geography ==
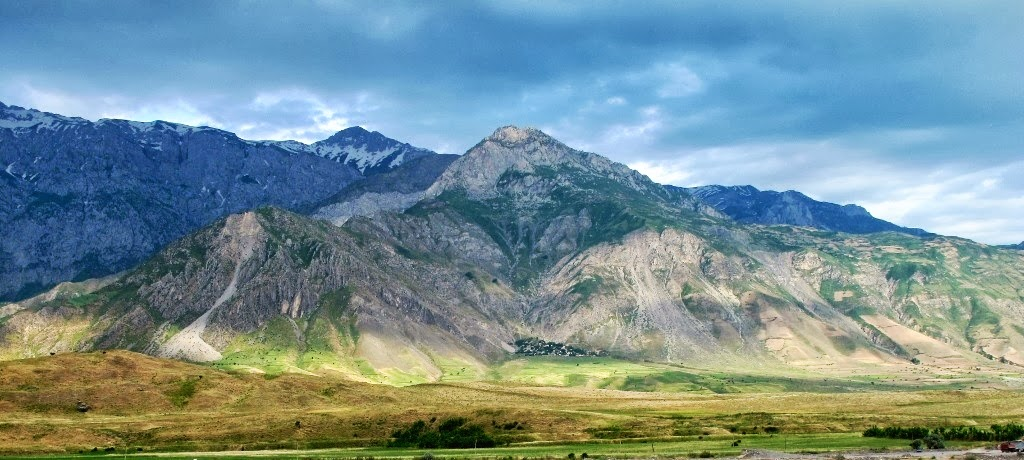
Muhalla-i Shohun in Shamsiddin Shohin district at the border with Khwahan district

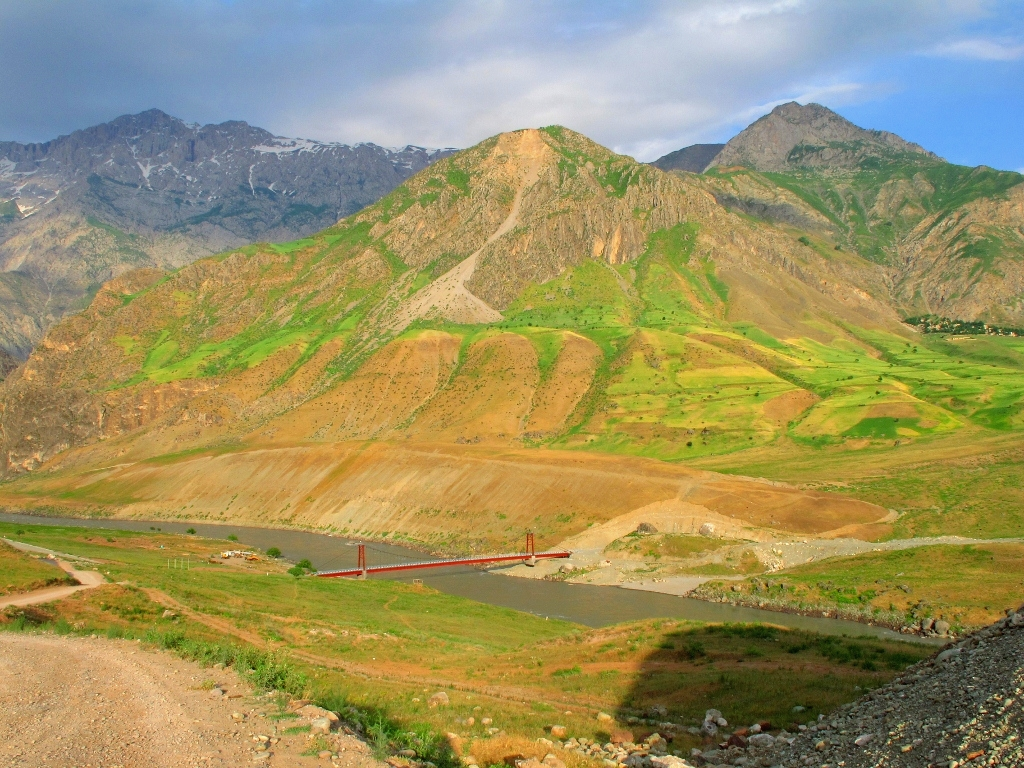
Friendship Bridge between Khwahan district, Badakhshan province, Afghanistan and Shamsiddin Shohin district, Khatlon region, Tajikistan

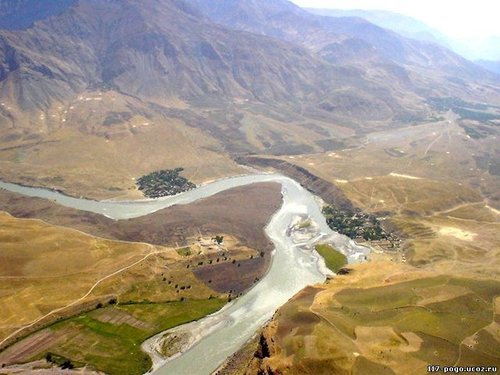
The two villages Kamar and Kaji by the Panj river

== History ==
After Alexander the Great overthrew the Persians, the area came under the rule of the Greco-Bactrian king Euthydemus I and his son Demetrius I

== Demography ==
The population of Khwahan district is approximately 27,000. The inhabitants of this area are ethnic Tajiks who speak Dari and are Sunni Muslim.

== Settlements ==
Below is a list of villages of Khwahan district in alphabetical order.

- Ambaran
- Bagh-e Sangak
- Bariki
- Bed-e Khva
- Bid Khvah
- Bostanak
- Chashma-i Tut
- Chetgah
- Chosnukel
- Darbandak
- Do Dargeh
- Dowlatabad
- Drel
- Ghalil
- Ghuzan
- Guzun
- Howz-e Shah-e Bala
- Howz-e Shah-e Pa'in
- Jerwu Bala
- Jerwu Pa'in
- Joy-i Saluk
- Kaji
- Kamar
- Kham-e Tugh
- Kham-i Bahar
- Khengan
- Kheyrabad
- Kowl Darrah
- Lal Margh
- Lughman
- Mushuk March
- Namaz-e Pas
- Now Abad
- Pari Kham
- Pashahr Abad
- Ruyanzar
- Safedab
- Safed Sangan
- Sang Ab
- Sar-e Biland
- Sayed Abad
- Sel Don
- Shahr-i Now
- Shalil
- Shing Darrah
- Tejkel
- Zardu
- Zarich

== Economy ==
The inhabitants of this area engage in agriculture. They grow buckwheat, red and white barley, sesame, zucchini, corn, mung beans, peas, beans, potatoes.

== See also ==
- Darwaz
