= Dashti-Jum =

Dashti-Jum Дашти Ҷум
- Jamoats-Towns
- Location of Shuroobod in Tajikistan
- Coordinates: 38°1′10″N 70°12′44″E
- Country: Tajikistan
- Region: Khatlon
- District: Shamsiddin Shohin

Population (2015)
  - Total: 4,942
- Time zone: GMT+5
- Postal code: 735180
- Area code: +992 3319

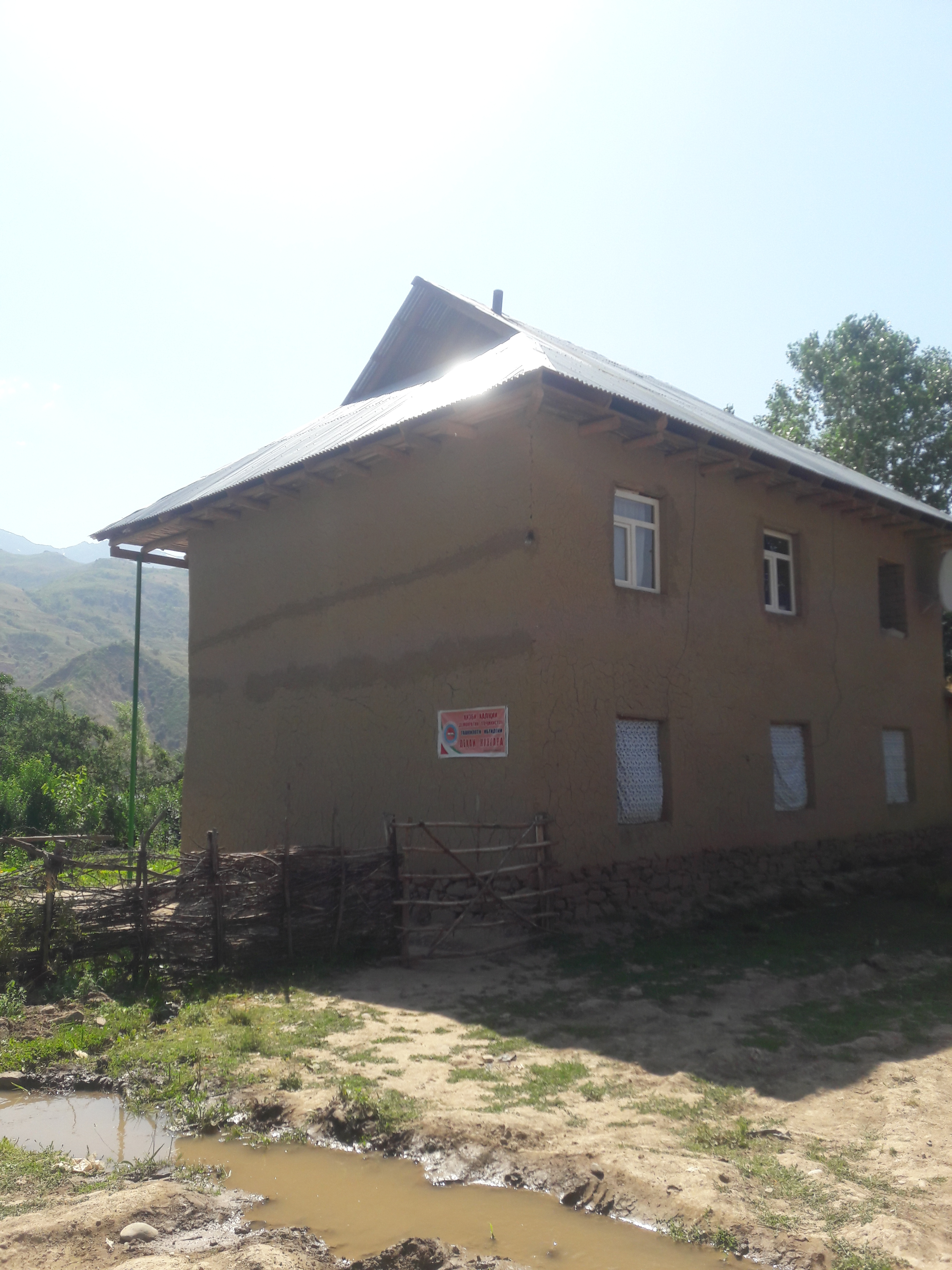
one of the village Tajikistan

Dashti-Jum (Tajik: Дашти Ҷум, Persian: دشت جوم), is a village and a jamoat in Tajikistan. It is located in Shamsiddin Shohin District in Khatlon Region. The jamoat has a total population of 4,942 (2015).
