= Sar Khun, Chaharmahal and Bakhtiari =

City in Chaharmahal and Bakhtiari province, Iran

Sar Khun Persian: سرخون
- City
- Location within Iran
- Coordinates: 31°44′59″N 50°33′04″E
- Country: Iran
- Province: Chaharmahal and Bakhtiari
- County: Ardal
- District: Miankuh
- Established as a city: 2013

Population (2016)
  - Total: 2,131
- Time zone: UTC+3:30 (IRST)

Sar Khun (Persian: سرخون) (Note: Also romanized as Sar Khūn) is a city in, and the capital of, Miankuh District in Ardal County, Chaharmahal and Bakhtiari province, Iran. As a village, it was the capital of Miankuh Rural District until its capital was transferred to the village of Deh Kohneh-ye Halu Saad.

== Demographics ==
=== Ethnicity ===
The city is populated by Lurs.

=== Population ===
At the time of the 2006 National Census, Sar Khun's population was 1,887 in 387 households, when it was a village in Miankuh Rural District. The following census in 2011 counted 1,737 people in 392 households. The 2016 census measured the population as 2,131 people in 392 households, by which time Sar Khun had been converted to a city.
