= Now Abad, Khwahan =

Now Abad نوآباد Now Abad
- Location in Khwahan Afghanistan
- Coordinates: 37°52′37″N 70°13′25″E
- Country: Afghanistan
- Province: Badakhshan
- District: Khwahan
- Elevation: 3,380 ft (1,030 m)
- Time zone: +4.30
  - Summer (DST): +4.30

Now Abad (Persian: نوآباد) is a village in the Khwahan District of Badakhshan in north-eastern Afghanistan.

== See also ==
- Badakhshan Province
