= Pashahr Abad =

Pashahr Abad پاشهرآباد
- Location in Afghanistan
- Coordinates: 37°53′53″N 70°12′45″E
- Country: Afghanistan
- Province: Badakhshan
- District: Khwahan
- Elevation: 1,000 m (3,300 ft)
- Time zone: + 4.30

Pashahr Abad Persian: پاشهرآباد is a Village in north-eastern Afghanistan . It is located in Khwahan District to Badakhshan province.

== See also ==
- Badakhshan Province
