= Safedab =

Safedab سفیدآب
- Location in Afghanistan
- Coordinates: 37°56′56″N 70°16′26″E
- Country: Afghanistan
- Province: Badakhshan
- District: Khwahan
- Elevation: 900 m (3,000 ft)
- Time zone: + 4.30

Safedab Persian: سفیدآب is a village in north-eastern Afghanistan . It is located in Khwahan District to Badakhshan province.

== See also ==
- Badakhshan Province
