= Darreh Dun, Andika =

Darreh Dun دره دون
- Village
- Location within Iran
- Coordinates: 32°13′02″N 49°33′34″E
- Country: Iran
- Province: Khuzestan
- County: Andika
- Bakhsh: Central
- Rural District: Shalal and Dasht-e Gol

Population (2006)
  - Total: 132
- Time zone: UTC+3:30 (IRST)
  - Summer (DST): UTC+4:30 (IRDT)

Darreh Dun (Persian: دره دون, also Romanized as Darreh Dūn and Darrehdūn) is a village in Shalal and Dasht-e Gol Rural District, in the Central District of Andika County, Khuzestan Province, Iran. At the 2006 census, its population was 132, in 20 families.
