= Emamzadeh Esmail, Kohgiluyeh and Boyer-Ahmad =

Emamzadeh Esmail امامزاده اسماعيل
- Village
- Location within Iran
- Coordinates: 30°28′59″N 50°40′31″E
- Country: Iran
- Province: Kohgiluyeh and Boyer-Ahmad
- County: Gachsaran
- Bakhsh: Central
- Rural District: Lishtar

Population (2006)
  - Total: 22
- Time zone: UTC+3:30 (IRST)
  - Summer (DST): UTC+4:30 (IRDT)

Emamzadeh Esmail (Persian: امامزاده اسماعيل, also Romanized as Emāmzādeh Esmā‘īl and Emāmzādeh-ye Esmā‘īl) is a village in Lishtar Rural District, in the Central District of Gachsaran County, Kohgiluyeh and Boyer-Ahmad Province, Iran. At the 2006 census, its population was 22, in 6 families.
