= Morghak-e Olya =

Morghak-e Olya مرغك عليا
- Village
- Location within Iran
- Coordinates: 29°06′23″N 57°54′04″E
- Country: Iran
- Province: Kerman
- County: Bam
- Bakhsh: Central
- Rural District: Deh Bakri

Population (2006)
  - Total: 282
- Time zone: UTC+3:30 (IRST)
  - Summer (DST): UTC+4:30 (IRDT)

Morghak-e Olya (Persian: مرغك عليا, also Romanized as Morghak-e ‘Olyā; also known as Marghak and Morghak) is a village in Deh Bakri Rural District, in the Central District of Bam County, Kerman Province, Iran. At the 2006 census, its population was 282, in 70 families.
