= Darreh Dun, Ramhormoz =

Darreh Dun دره دون
- Village
- Location within Iran
- Coordinates: 31°10′45″N 49°38′08″E
- Country: Iran
- Province: Khuzestan
- County: Ramhormoz
- Bakhsh: Central
- Rural District: Howmeh-ye Sharqi

Population (2006)
  - Total: 166
- Time zone: UTC+3:30 (IRST)
  - Summer (DST): UTC+4:30 (IRDT)

Darreh Dun (Persian: دره دون, also Romanized as Darreh Dūn; also known as Darreh Dān) is a village in Howmeh-ye Sharqi Rural District, in the Central District of Ramhormoz County, Khuzestan Province, Iran. At the 2006 census, its population was 166, in 43 families.
