= Tehray =

Tehray Теҳрай
- Village and Jamoat
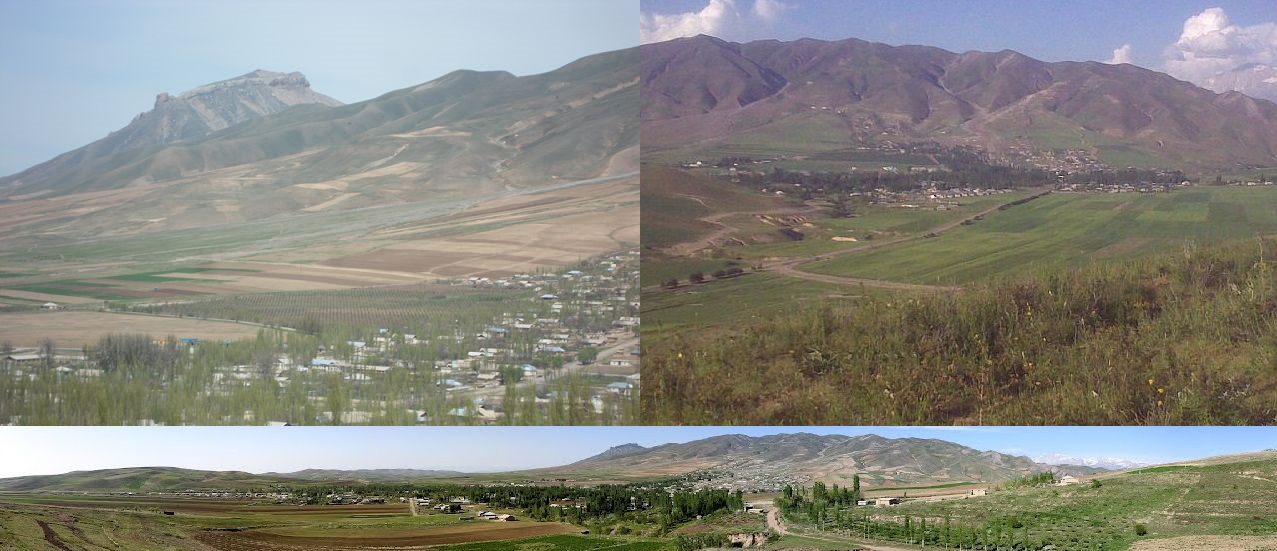

- Location of Shuroobod in Tajikistan
- Coordinates: 37°50′25″N 70°2′31″E
- Country: Tajikistan
- Region: Khatlon Region
- District: Shamsiddin Shohin District

Population (2015)
  - Total: 10,700
- Time zone: GMT+5
- Postal code: 735180
- Area code: +992 3319
- Official languages: Russian (Interethnic); Tajik (State)

Tehray (Tajik: Теҳрай) is a jamoat that is located in the Khatlon Region of southern Tajikistan. It is the seat of the Shamsiddin Shohin District. As of 2015, the jamoat had a total population of 10,700.

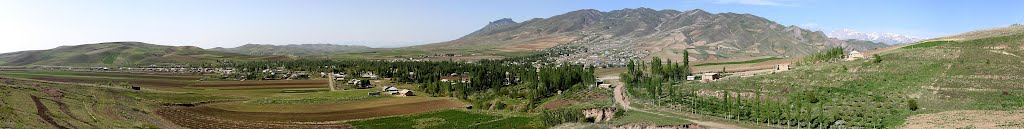
The prospect of the Shuro-obod city چشم اندازی از شهر شوراآباد
