= Shamsiddin Shohin District =

Shamsiddin Shohin District Russian: Район Шамсиддин Шохин Tajik: Ноҳияи Шамсиддин Шоҳин
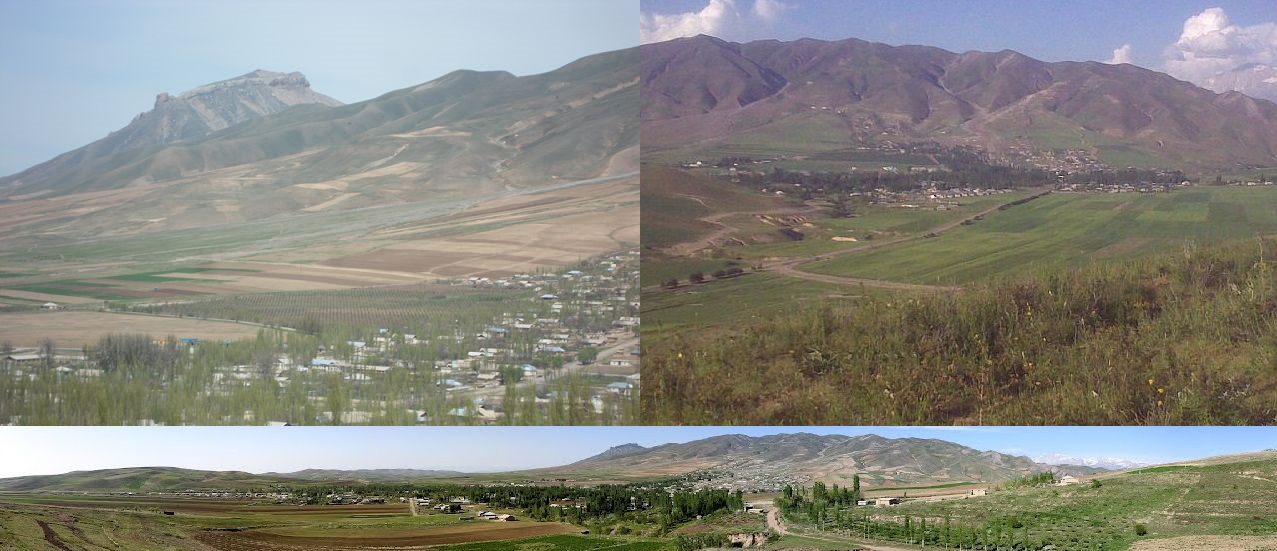
- Shuroobod City

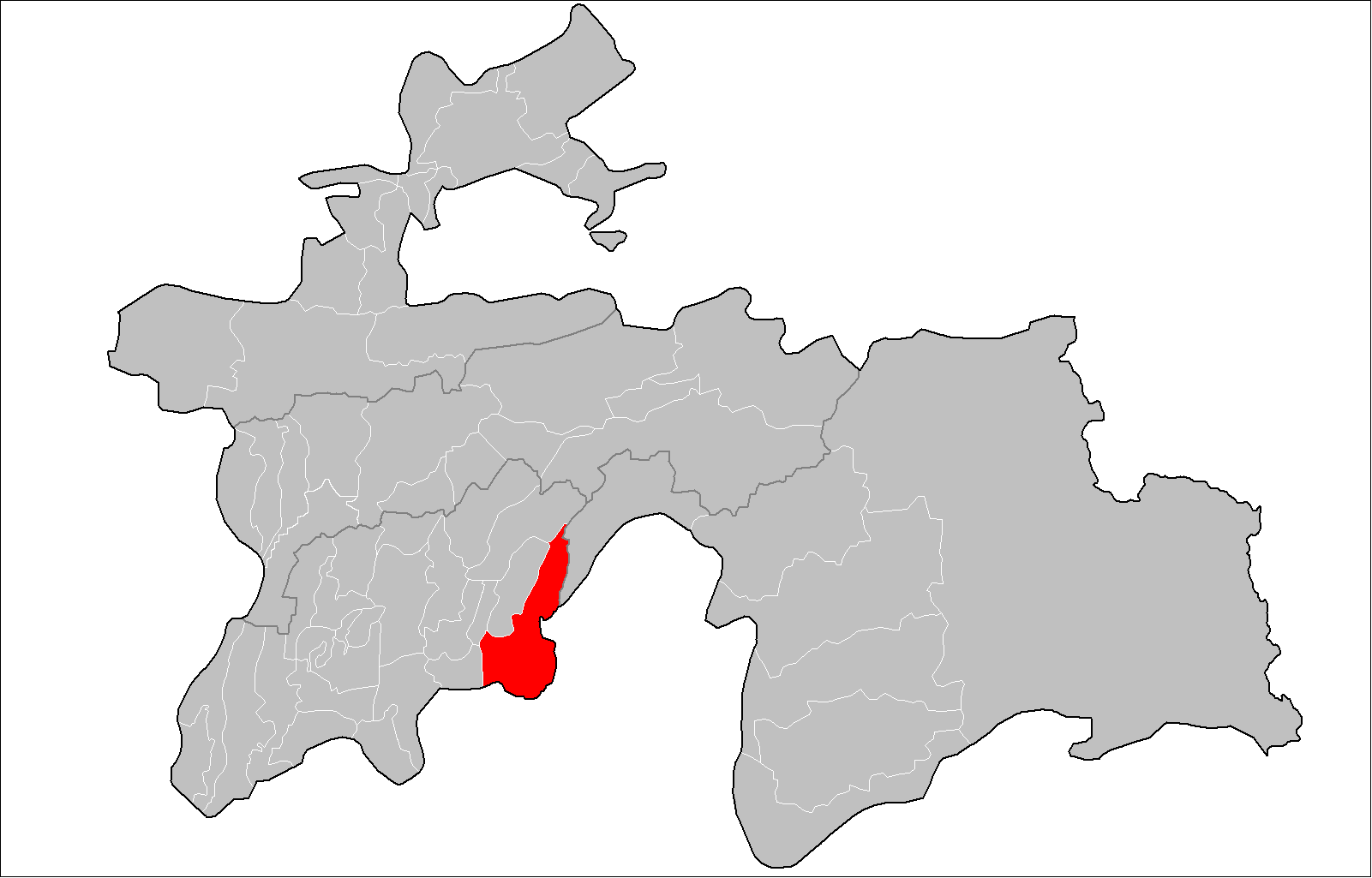
- Shamsiddin Shohin District Location in Tajikistan
- Coordinates: 37°50′24″N 70°2′31″E
- Country: Tajikistan
- Region: Khatlon Region
- Established: 16 Mar 1938
- Capital: Shuroobod

Area
  - Total: 2,300 km^{2} (890 sq mi)

Population (2020)
  - Total: 55,500
  - Density: 24/km^{2} (62/sq mi)
- Time zone: UTC+5
- Area code: +992-3319
- Official languages: Russian (Interethnic); Tajik (State)
- Website: www.shamsiddinshohin.tj

Shamsiddin Shohin District (Russian: Район Шамсиддин Шохин; Tajik: Ноҳияи Шамсиддин Шоҳин Nohiyai Shamsiddin Shohin, before 2016 Shuroobod District Tajik: Ноҳияи Шуро-обод), is a district in Khatlon Region, southeastern Tajikistan. Its capital is the village Shuroobod.

Shuroobod District was renamed Shamsiddin Shohin in memory of this Tajik poet.

== Administrative divisions ==
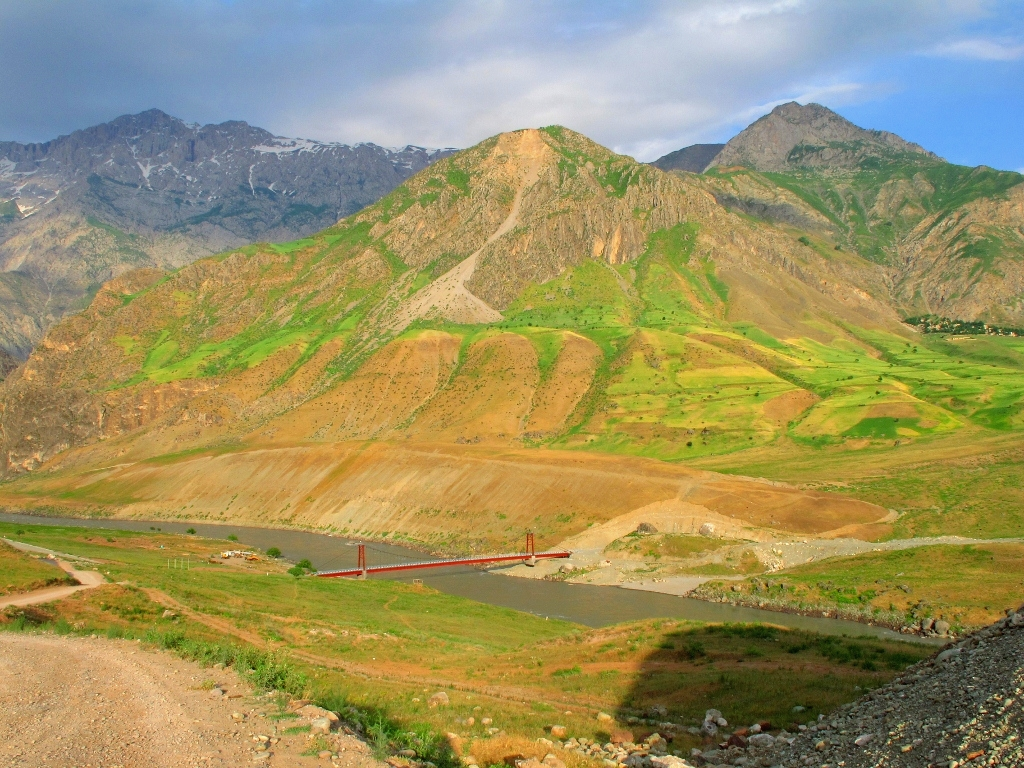
Friendship Bridge between Afghanistan, and Tajikistan, in Khwahan, regions and Shamsiddin Shohin

The district has an area of about 2,300 km^{2} (900 sq mi) and is divided administratively into seven jamoats. They are as follows:

Jamoat	Population (Jan. 2015)
Chagam	6,097
Dashti-Jum	4,942
Doghiston	7,092
Langardara	4,895
Nuriddin Mahmudov (Yol)	6,446
Sarichashma	11,680
Shuroobod	10,700

== Geography ==
Shamsiddin Shohin District is bordered in the north by Darvoz District and Khovaling District, in the west by Mu'minobod District and Hamadoni District, all in Khatlon Region. In the east and south, across the river Panj, it borders Afghanistan. It is located in the foothills of the Hazrati Shoh mountains.
