= Shalil, Badakhshan =

Shalil شالیل
- Location in Afghanistan
- Coordinates: 37°44′57″N 70°28′4″E
- Country: Afghanistan
- Province: Badakhshan
- District: Khwahan
- Time zone: + 4.30

Shalil (Persian: شالیل) is a village in north-eastern Afghanistan. It is located in Khwahan District of Badakhshan Province.

== See also ==
- Badakhshan Province
