= Qalʽeh-ye Mirza Shah =

- Location in Afghanistan
- Coordinates: 37°22′7″N 70°53′53″E
- Country: Afghanistan
- Province: Badakhshan Province
- Time zone: + 4.30

Qalʽeh-ye Mirza Shah is a village in Badakhshan Province in north-eastern Afghanistan.

== See also ==
- Badakhshan Province
