= Shalil Rural District =

Rural district in Chaharmahal and Bakhtiari province, Iran

Shalil Rural District Persian: دهستان شليل
- Rural District
- Location within Iran
- Coordinates: 31°44′N 50°26′E
- Country: Iran
- Province: Chaharmahal and Bakhtiari
- County: Ardal
- District: Miankuh
- Established: 1990
- Capital: Shokrabad

Population (2016)
  - Total: 4,593
- Time zone: UTC+3:30 (IRST)

Shalil Rural District (Persian: دهستان شليل) is in Miankuh District of Ardal County, Chaharmahal and Bakhtiari province, Iran. Its capital is the village of Shokrabad.

== Demographics ==
=== Population ===
At the time of the 2006 National Census, the rural district's population was 6,158 in 1,150 households. There were 5,618 inhabitants in 1,161 households at the following census of 2011. The 2016 census measured the population of the rural district as 4,593 in 1,142 households. The most populous of its 29 villages was Shokrabad, with 823 people.

=== Other villages in the rural district ===
- Durak Qanbari
- Ezzatabad
- Landi
