= Miankuh Rural District (Ardal County) =

Rural district in Chaharmahal and Bakhtiari province, Iran

Miankuh Rural District Persian: دهستان ميانكوه
- Rural District
- Location within Iran
- Coordinates: 31°45′N 50°32′E
- Country: Iran
- Province: Chaharmahal and Bakhtiari
- County: Ardal
- District: Miankuh
- Established: 1987
- Capital: Deh Kohneh-ye Halu Saad

Population (2016)
  - Total: 6,973
- Time zone: UTC+3:30 (IRST)

Miankuh Rural District (Persian: دهستان ميانكوه) is in Miankuh District of Ardal County, Chaharmahal and Bakhtiari province, Iran. Its capital is the village of Deh Kohneh-ye Halu Saad. The previous capital of the rural district was the village of Sar Khun, now a city.

== Demographics ==
=== Population ===
At the time of the 2006 National Census, the rural district's population was 10,622 in 2,161 households. There were 10,709 inhabitants in 2,587 households at the following census of 2011. The 2016 census measured the population of the rural district as 6,973 in 1,917 households. The most populous of its 31 villages was Refen, with 991 people.

=== Other villages in the rural district ===
- Gandomkar-e Sofla
- Shahrak-e Shiasi
