= Miankuh District =

District in Chaharmahal and Bakhtiari province, Iran

Miankuh District Persian: بخش میانکوه
- District
- Location within Iran
- Coordinates: 31°45′N 50°30′E
- Country: Iran
- Province: Chaharmahal and Bakhtiari
- County: Ardal
- Established: 1990
- Capital: Sar Khun

Population (2016)
  - Total: 13,697
- Time zone: UTC+3:30 (IRST)

Miankuh District (Persian: بخش میانکوه) is in Ardal County, Chaharmahal and Bakhtiari province, Iran. Its capital is the city of Sar Khun.

== History ==
The village of Sar Khun was converted to a city in 2013.

== Demographics ==
=== Population ===
At the time of the 2006 National Census, the district's population was 16,780 in 3,311 households. The following census in 2011 counted 16,327 people in 3,748 households. The 2016 census measured the population of the district as 13,697 inhabitants living in 3,631 households.

=== Administrative divisions ===
Miankuh District Population
Administrative Divisions	2006	2011	2016
Miankuh RD	10,622	10,709	6,973
Shalil RD	6,158	5,618	4,593
Sar Khun (city)			2,131
Total	16,780	16,327	13,697
RD = Rural District
