= Postal codes in Afghanistan =

Afghan Post
Postal Authority overview
- Website: http://afghanpost.gov.af

Afghanistan introduced Postal Codes/ZIP codes in 2011 in a press conference held in Kabul. They are managed by Afghan Post, the national public postal service under the direction of Afghan Ministry of Communications and Information Technology.

Afghanistan postal codes are four digits (NNNN). The first two digits (ranging from 10–43) correspond to the province, while the last two digits correspond either to the city/delivery zone (range 01–50) or to the district/delivery zone (range 51–99).
