= Ardal County =

County in Chaharmahal and Bakhtiari province, Iran

Ardal County Persian: شهرستان اردل
- County
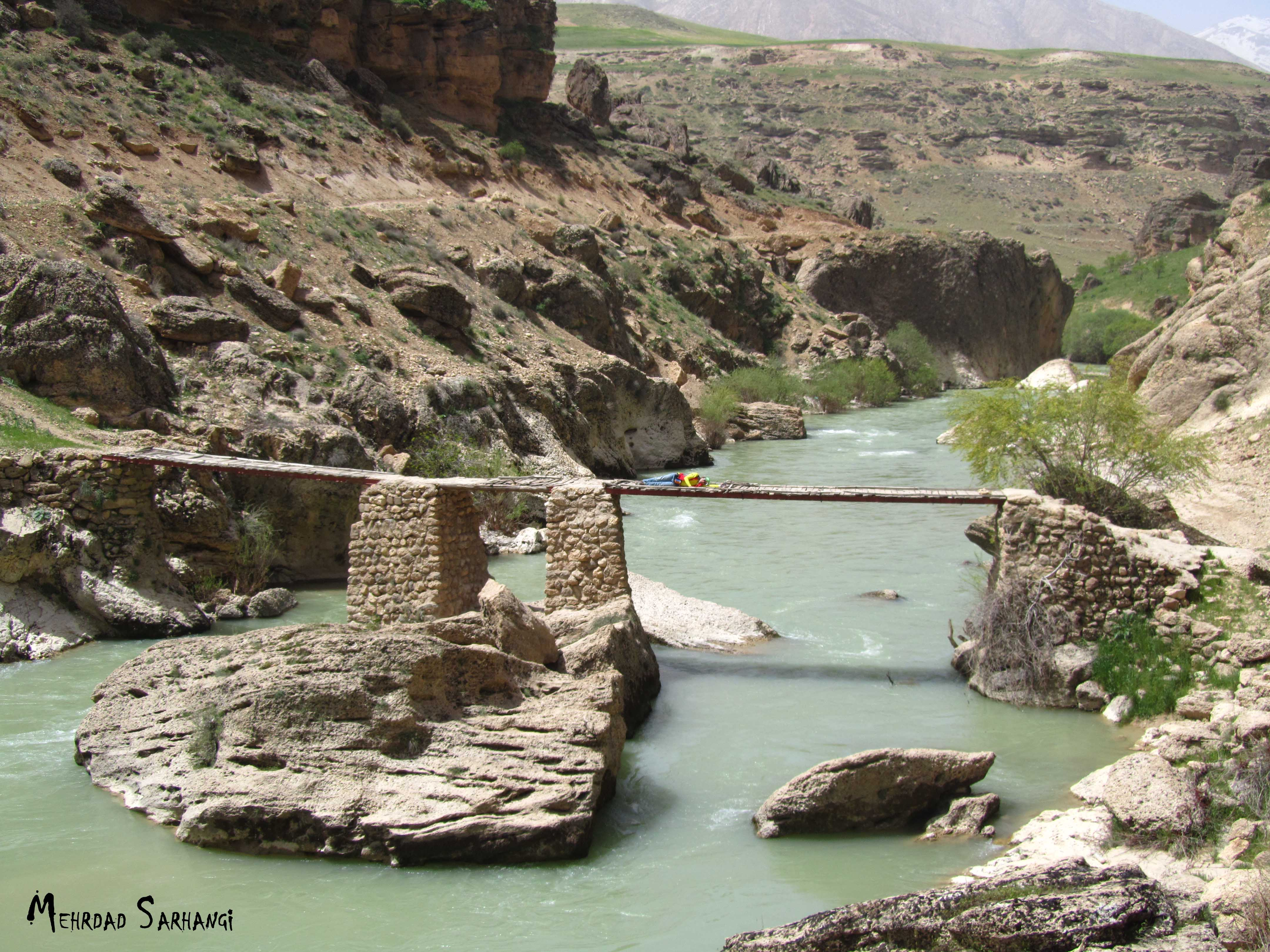
- Old bridge in the village of Qaleh Darvish

- Location of Ardal County in Chaharmahal and Bakhtiari province (left, green)

- Location of Chaharmahal and Bakhtiari province in Iran
- Coordinates: 31°55′N 50°28′E
- Country: Iran
- Province: Chaharmahal and Bakhtiari
- Established: 1990
- Capital: Ardal
- Districts: Central, Miankuh

Population (2016)
  - Total: 48,880
- Time zone: UTC+3:30 (IRST)

Ardal County (Persian: شهرستان اردل) is in Chaharmahal and Bakhtiari province, Iran. Its capital is the city of Ardal.

== History ==
In 2007, Mashayekh and Naghan Rural Districts, and the city of Naghan, were separated from the county in the establishment of Kiar County.

In 2013, the villages of Dashtak, Kaj, and Sar Khun were converted to cities.

== Demographics ==
=== Population ===
At the time of the 2006 National Census, the county's population was 68,740 in 14,474 households. The following census in 2011 counted 53,514 people, in 12,703 households. The 2016 census measured the population of the county as 48,880 in 13,066 households.

=== Administrative divisions ===
Ardal County's population history and administrative structure over three consecutive censuses are shown in the following table.

Ardal County Population
Administrative Divisions	2006	2011	2016
Central District	51,960	37,187	35,179
Dinaran RD	7,548	6,800	5,890
Mashayekh RD (Note: Transferred to Kiar County)	7,158		
Naghan RD	3,286		
Poshtkuh RD	20,878	21,395	10,933
Ardal (city)	8,162	8,992	10,113
Dashtak (city)			4,016
Kaj (city)			4,227
Naghan (city)	4,928		
Miankuh District	16,780	16,327	13,697
Miankuh RD	10,622	10,709	6,973
Shalil RD	6,158	5,618	4,593
Sar Khun (city)			2,131
Total	68,740	53,514	48,880
RD = Rural District

== See also ==
Media related to Ardal County at Wikimedia Commons
