= Time in Afghanistan =

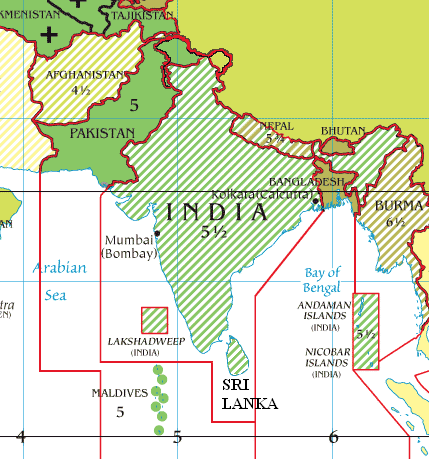
Time zones of South Asia (numbers are hours ahead of UTC)

The time in Afghanistan follows a single standard time offset of UTC+04:30 (four and a half hours ahead of Coordinated Universal Time), even though the country spans almost two geographical time zones.

The official national standard time is called Afghanistan Time (AFT) internationally.

== Daylight saving time ==
Afghanistan has never observed daylight saving time. Afghanistan uses only one time zone across the whole nation and all its territories.

== IANA time zone database ==
The territory of the Islamic Republic of Afghanistan is covered in the IANA time zone database. The IANA time zone identifier for Afghanistan is Asia/Kabul.

For Afghanistan, the tz database time zones contains one zone in the file zone.tab.

Columns marked with * are from the file zone.tab of the database.

| c.c.* | coordinates* | TZ* | comments* | Standard time | Summer time | Notes |
|---|---|---|---|---|---|---|
| AF | +3431+06912 | Asia/Kabul | | +04:30 | —N/a | |

== See also ==
- Time in Iran
- Time in Pakistan
- Time in Kyrgyzstan
