= Posht-e Tang =

Posht-e Tang or Posht Tang or Poshtang (Persian: پُشتِ تَنگ) may refer to:

- Posht-e Tang, Bushehr
- Posht Tang, Hormozgan
- Posht Tang, Kermanshah
- Posht Tang, Bijar, Kurdistan Province
- Posht Tang-e Cheshmeh Qolijan
- Posht Tang-e Dar Vazneh
- Posht Tang-e Dustali
- Posht Tang-e Kordali
- Posht Tang-e Khushab
- Posht Tang-e Mishvand
- Posht Tang-e Olya
- Posht Tang-e Olya, Lorestan
- Posht Tang-e Parian
- Posht Tang-e Shah Mirza
- Posht Tang-e Shayengan
- Posht Tang-e Sofla
- Posht Tang-e Sofla, Lorestan
- Posht Tang-e Sofla Rahim Khan
- Posht Tang-e Sofla Seyyed Reza
- Posht Tang-e Vosta (disambiguation)
- Posht-e Tang-e Chenar
- Posht-e Tang-e Firuzabad
- Posht-e Tang-e Gol Gol
- Poshtang-e Gari
- Posht Tang Rural District, in Kermanshah Province
