= Vashian =

Vashian or Vashiyan or Vasheyan (Persian: واشيان may refer to:

- Vashian-e Chah-e Shirin
- Vashian-e Cheshmeh Shirin
- Vashian-e Karim Hoseyn
- Vashian-e Nasir Tappeh
- Vashian-e Nosrati
- Vashian-e Takht Shir
