= Khersdar =

Khersdar (Persian: خرسدر) may refer to:

- Khers Dar
- Khersdar Darreh Dimeh
- Khersdar-e Kakamorad
- Khersdar-e Olya
- Khersdar-e Sofla
