= Rahimabad, Pol-e Dokhtar =

Village in Lorestan province, Iran

Rahimabad Persian: رحيم اباد
- Village
- Location within Iran
- Coordinates: 33°07′58″N 47°41′38″E
- Country: Iran
- Province: Lorestan
- County: Pol-e Dokhtar
- District: Central
- Rural District: Jayedar-e Shomali

Population (2016)
  - Total: 370
- Time zone: UTC+3:30 (IRST)

Rahimabad (Persian: رحيم اباد) (Note: Also romanized as Raḩīmābād) is a village in, and the capital of, Jayedar-e Shomali Rural District (Note: Formerly Jayedar Rural District) in the Central District of Pol-e Dokhtar County, Lorestan province, Iran. The previous capital of the rural district was the village of Valieasr, (Note: Now in Jayedar-e Jonubi Rural District of Bala Geriveh District) transferred from the original capital, the village of Sarab Hammam, upon the latter's conversion to a city.

== Demographics ==
=== Population ===
At the time of the 2006 National Census, the village's population was 244 in 54 households. The following census in 2011 counted 388 people in 91 households. The 2016 census measured the population of the village as 370 people in 96 households.
