= Dartil =

Village in Lorestan province, Iran

Dartil Persian: دارتيل
- Village
- Country: Iran
- Province: Lorestan
- County: Pol-e Dokhtar
- District: Bala Geriveh
- Rural District: Jayedar-e Jonubi

Population (2016)
  - Total: Below reporting threshold
- Time zone: UTC+3:30 (IRST)

Dartil (Persian: دارتيل) (Note: Also romanized as Dārtīl) is a village in Jayedar-e Jonubi Rural District of Bala Geriveh District in Pol-e Dokhtar County, Lorestan province, Iran.

== Demographics ==
=== Population ===
At the time of the 2006 National Census, the village's population was 40 in six households, when it was in Jelogir Rural District of the Central District. The following censuses in 2011 and 2016 counted a population below the reporting threshold.

In 2023, the rural district was separated from the district in the formation of Bala Geriveh District, and Dartil was transferred to Jayedar-e Jonubi Rural District created in the new district.
