= Chaleh, Pol-e Dokhtar =

Village in Lorestan province, Iran

Chaleh Persian: چاله
- Village
- Location within Iran
- Coordinates: 33°03′12″N 47°36′43″E
- Country: Iran
- Province: Lorestan
- County: Pol-e Dokhtar
- District: Bala Geriveh
- Rural District: Jayedar-e Jonubi

Area
  - Village: 0.37 km^{2} (0.14 sq mi)
  - Urban: 0.09 km^{2} (0.035 sq mi)
- Highest elevation: 647 m (2,123 ft)
- Lowest elevation: 639 m (2,096 ft)

Population (2016)
  - Village: 223
  - Density: 600/km^{2} (1,600/sq mi)
- Time zone: UTC+3:30 (IRST)

Chaleh (Persian: چاله) (Note: Also romanized as Chāleh) is a village in Jayedar-e Jonubi Rural District of Bala Geriveh District in Pol-e Dokhtar County, Lorestan province, Iran.

== Demographics ==
=== Population ===
At the time of the 2006 National Census, the village's population was 233 in 43 households, when it was in Jayedar Rural District of the Central District. (Note: Renamed Jayedar-e Shomali Rural District) The following census in 2011 counted 218 people in 52 households. The 2016 census measured the population of the village as 223 people in 65 households.

In 2023, the rural district was renamed Jayedar-e Shomali Rural District, and the village was separated from it in the formation of Bala Geriveh District. Chaleh was transferred to Jayedar-e Jonubi Rural District created in the new district.
