= Chah Shureh =

Chah Shureh (Persian: چاه شوره) may refer to:

- Chah Shureh-ye Olya
- Chah Shureh-ye Sofla
- Chah Shureh-ye Vosta
