= Chalkal-e Sofla =

Village in Lorestan province, Iran

Chalkal-e Sofla Persian: چال كل سفلي
- Village
- Location within Iran
- Country: Iran
- Province: Lorestan
- County: Pol-e Dokhtar
- District: Bala Geriveh
- Rural District: Jayedar-e Jonubi

Population (2016)
  - Total: 40
- Time zone: UTC+3:30 (IRST)

Chalkal-e Sofla (Persian: چال كل سفلي) (Note: Also romanized as Chāl Kal-e Soflá and Chālkal-e Soflá; also known as Chāl Gal-e Soflá) is a village in Jayedar-e Jonubi Rural District of Bala Geriveh District in Pol-e Dokhtar County, Lorestan province, Iran.

== Demographics ==
=== Population ===
At the time of the 2006 National Census, the village's population was 135 in 22 households, when it was in Jayedar Rural District of the Central District. (Note: Renamed Jayedar-e Shomali Rural District) The following census in 2011 counted 43 people in 12 households. The 2016 census measured the population of the village as 40 people in 11 households.

In 2023, the rural district was renamed Jayedar-e Shomali Rural District, and the village was separated from it in the formation of Bala Geriveh District. Chalkal-e Sofla was transferred to Jayedar-e Jonubi Rural District created in the new district.
