= Darreh Bagh, Pol-e Dokhtar =

Village in Lorestan province, Iran

Darreh Bagh Persian: دره باغ
- Village
- Location within Iran
- Country: Iran
- Province: Lorestan
- County: Pol-e Dokhtar
- District: Bala Geriveh
- Rural District: Jayedar-e Jonubi

Population (2016)
  - Total: Below reporting threshold
- Time zone: UTC+3:30 (IRST)

Darreh Bagh (Persian: دره باغ) (Note: Also romanized as Darreh Bāgh) is a village in Jayedar-e Jonubi Rural District of Bala Geriveh District in Pol-e Dokhtar County, Lorestan province, Iran.

== Demographics ==
=== Population ===
At the time of the 2006 National Census, the village's population was 16 in four households, when it was in Jelogir Rural District of the Central District. The following census in 2011 counted 34 people in seven households. The 2016 census measured the population of the village as below the reporting threshold.

In 2023, the rural district was separated from the district in the formation of Bala Geriveh District, and Darreh Bagh was transferred to Jayedar-e Jonubi Rural District created in the new district.
