= Baba Khvarazm =

Baba Khvarazm (Persian: باباخوارزم) may refer to:

- Baba Khvarazm-e Karim
- Baba Khvarazm-e Mojir
- Baba Khvarazm-e Olya
