= Gol-e Sorkh =

Gol-e Sorkh or Gol Sorkh (Persian: گل سر) may refer to:

- Gol-e Sorkh, Chaharmahal and Bakhtiari, a village
- Gol-e Sorkh, Kerman, a village
- Kol-e Sorkh Yeydi, a village
- Gol-e-Sorkh Square, a square
