= Saramad =

Village in Lorestan province, Iran

Saramad Persian: سرامد
- Village
- Location within Iran
- Coordinates: 32°58′24″N 48°11′35″E
- Country: Iran
- Province: Lorestan
- County: Pol-e Dokhtar
- District: Bala Geriveh
- Rural District: Jayedar-e Jonubi

Population (2016)
  - Total: Below reporting threshold
- Time zone: UTC+3:30 (IRST)

Saramad (Persian: سرامد) (Note: Also romanized as Sarāmad) is a village in Jayedar-e Jonubi Rural District of Bala Geriveh District in Pol-e Dokhtar County, Lorestan province, Iran.

== Demographics ==
=== Population ===
At the time of the 2006 National Census, the village's population was 39 in nine households, when it was in Jelogir Rural District of the Central District. The following census in 2011 counted 32 people in seven households. The 2016 census measured the population of the village as below the reporting threshold.

In 2023, the rural district was separated from the district in the formation of Bala Geriveh District, and Saramad was transferred to Jayedar-e Jonubi Rural District created in the new district.
