= Darreh Shureh =

Village in Lorestan province, Iran

Darreh Shureh Persian: دره شوره
- Village
- Location within Iran
- Coordinates: 33°09′49″N 48°07′10″E
- Country: Iran
- Province: Lorestan
- County: Pol-e Dokhtar
- District: Bala Geriveh
- Rural District: Jayedar-e Jonubi

Population (2016)
  - Total: 18
- Time zone: UTC+3:30 (IRST)

Darreh Shureh (Persian: دره شوره) (Note: Also romanized as Darreh Shūreh; also known as Darreh Shūr) is a village in Jayedar-e Jonubi Rural District of Bala Geriveh District in Pol-e Dokhtar County, Lorestan province, Iran.

== Demographics ==
=== Population ===
At the time of the 2006 National Census, the village's population was 58 in 11 households, when it was in Jelogir Rural District of the Central District. The following census in 2011 counted 39 people in nine households. The 2016 census measured the population of the village as 18 people in four households.

In 2023, the rural district was separated from the district in the formation of Bala Geriveh District, and Darreh Shureh was transferred to Jayedar-e Jonubi Rural District created in the new district.
