= Konar Balut =

Village in Lorestan province, Iran

Konar Balut Persian: كناربلوط
- Village
- Location within Iran
- Coordinates: 33°00′35″N 47°45′03″E
- Country: Iran
- Province: Lorestan
- County: Pol-e Dokhtar
- District: Bala Geriveh
- Rural District: Jayedar-e Jonubi

Population (2016)
  - Total: 268
- Time zone: UTC+3:30 (IRST)

Konar Balut (Persian: كناربلوط) (Note: Also romanized as Konār Balūţ) is a village in Jayedar-e Jonubi Rural District of Bala Geriveh District in Pol-e Dokhtar County, Lorestan province, Iran.

== Demographics ==
=== Population ===
At the time of the 2006 National Census, the village's population was 328 in 66 households, when it was in Jelogir Rural District of the Central District. The following census in 2011 counted 308 people in 75 households. The 2016 census measured the population of the village as 268 people in 75 households.

In 2023, the rural district was separated from the district in the formation of Bala Geriveh District, and Konar Balut was transferred to Jayedar-e Jonubi Rural District created in the new district.
