= Haft Cheshmeh, Pol-e Dokhtar =

Village in Lorestan province, Iran

Haft Cheshmeh Persian: هفت‌چشمه
- Village
- Location within Iran
- Coordinates: 33°03′34″N 47°46′45″E
- Country: Iran
- Province: Lorestan
- County: Pol-e Dokhtar
- District: Bala Geriveh
- Rural District: Jayedar-e Jonubi

Population (2016)
  - Total: 63
- Time zone: UTC+3:30 (IRST)

Haft Cheshmeh (Persian: هفت‌چشمه) is a village in Jayedar-e Jonubi Rural District of Bala Geriveh District in Pol-e Dokhtar County, Lorestan province, Iran.

== Demographics ==
=== Population ===
At the time of the 2006 National Census, the village's population was 66 in 11 households, when it was in Jayedar Rural District of the Central District. (Note: Renamed Jayedar-e Shomali Rural District) The following census in 2011 counted 64 people in 16 households. The 2016 census measured the population of the village as 63 people in 17 households.

In 2023, the rural district was renamed Jayedar-e Shomali Rural District, and the village was separated from it in the formation of Bala Geriveh District. Haft Cheshmeh was transferred to Jayedar-e Jonubi Rural District created in the new district.
