= Sarab-e Rajab =

Village in Lorestan province, Iran

Sarab-e Rajab Persian: سراب رجب
- Village
- Location within Iran
- Coordinates: 33°00′56″N 47°46′01″E
- Country: Iran
- Province: Lorestan
- County: Pol-e Dokhtar
- District: Bala Geriveh
- Rural District: Jayedar-e Jonubi

Population (2016)
  - Total: 411
- Time zone: UTC+3:30 (IRST)

Sarab-e Rajab (Persian: سراب رجب) (Note: Also romanized as Sarāb-e Rajab) is a village in Jayedar-e Jonubi Rural District of Bala Geriveh District in Pol-e Dokhtar County, Lorestan province, Iran.

== Demographics ==
=== Population ===
At the time of the 2006 National Census, the village's population was 511 in 113 households, when it was in Jelogir Rural District of the Central District. The following census in 2011 counted 480 people in 126 households. The 2016 census measured the population of the village as 411 people in 128 households.

In 2023, the rural district was separated from the district in the formation of Bala Geriveh District, and Sarab-e Rajab was transferred to Jayedar-e Jonubi Rural District created in the new district.
