= Qaleh Zanjir, Lorestan =

Village in Lorestan province, Iran

Qaleh Zanjir Persian: قلعه زنجير
- Village
- Location within Iran
- Coordinates: 33°00′10″N 48°12′12″E
- Country: Iran
- Province: Lorestan
- County: Pol-e Dokhtar
- District: Bala Geriveh
- Rural District: Jayedar-e Jonubi

Population (2016)
  - Total: 46
- Time zone: UTC+3:30 (IRST)

Qaleh Zanjir (Persian: قلعه زنجير) (Note: Also romanized as Qal‘eh Zanjīr; also known as Qala Zanjir and Qalā‘ Zanjīr) is a village in Jayedar-e Jonubi Rural District of Bala Geriveh District in Pol-e Dokhtar County, Lorestan province, Iran.

== Demographics ==
=== Population ===
At the time of the 2006 National Census, the village's population was 56 in 10 households, when it was in Jelogir Rural District of the Central District. The following census in 2011 counted 53 people in 11 households. The 2016 census measured the population of the village as 46 people in 11 households.

In 2023, the rural district was separated from the district in the formation of Bala Geriveh District, and Qaleh Zanjir was transferred to Jayedar-e Jonubi Rural District created in the new district.
