= Gori Balmak =

Village in Lorestan province, Iran

Gori Balmak Persian: گری بلمک
- Village
- Location within Iran
- Coordinates: 33°04′30″N 47°43′56″E
- Country: Iran
- Province: Lorestan
- County: Pol-e Dokhtar
- District: Bala Geriveh
- Rural District: Jayedar-e Jonubi

Population (2016)
  - Total: 253
- Time zone: UTC+3:30 (IRST)

Gori Balmak (Persian: گری بلمک) (Note: Also romanized as Gorī Balmak) is a village in, and the capital of, Jayedar-e Jonubi Rural District in Bala Geriveh District of Pol-e Dokhtar County, Lorestan province, Iran.

== Demographics ==
=== Population ===
At the time of the 2006 National Census, the village's population was 303 in 55 households, when it was in Jayedar Rural District of the Central District. (Note: Renamed Jayedar-e Shomali Rural District) The following census in 2011 counted 253 people in 58 households. The 2016 census measured the population of the village as 253 people in 67 households.

In 2023, the rural district was renamed Jayedar-e Shomali Rural District, and the village was separated from it in the formation of Bala Geriveh District. Gori Balmak was transferred to Jayedar-e Jonubi Rural District created in the new district.
