= Gori Babakhan =

Village in Lorestan province, Iran

Gori Babakhan Persian: گري باباخان
- Village
- Location within Iran
- Coordinates: 33°01′42″N 47°45′46″E
- Country: Iran
- Province: Lorestan
- County: Pol-e Dokhtar
- District: Bala Geriveh
- Rural District: Jayedar-e Jonubi

Population (2016)
  - Total: 175
- Time zone: UTC+3:30 (IRST)

Gori Babakhan (Persian: گري باباخان) (Note: Also romanized as Gari Babakhan, Garī Bābākhān, Gorī Bābā Khān, and Gorī Bābākhān; also known as Gūrī Bābā Khān and Shohadā) is a village in Jayedar-e Jonubi Rural District of Bala Geriveh District in Pol-e Dokhtar County, Lorestan province, Iran.

== Demographics ==
=== Population ===
At the time of the 2006 National Census, the village's population was 249 in 60 households, when it was in Jelogir Rural District of the Central District. The following census in 2011 counted 230 people in 60 households. The 2016 census measured the population of the village as 175 people in 52 households.

In 2023, the rural district was separated from the district in the formation of Bala Geriveh District, and Gori Babakhan was transferred to Jayedar-e Jonubi Rural District created in the new district.
