= Chutash-e Yekshanbeh =

Village in Lorestan province, Iran

Chutash-e Yekshanbeh Persian: چوتاش يكشنبه
- Village
- Location within Iran
- Coordinates: 33°03′15″N 47°47′36″E
- Country: Iran
- Province: Lorestan
- County: Pol-e Dokhtar
- District: Bala Geriveh
- Rural District: Jayedar-e Jonubi

Population (2016)
  - Total: 66
- Time zone: UTC+3:30 (IRST)

Chutash-e Yekshanbeh (Persian: چوتاش يكشنبه) (Note: Also romanized as Chūtāsh-e Yekshanbeh) is a village in Jayedar-e Jonubi Rural District of Bala Geriveh District in Pol-e Dokhtar County, Lorestan province, Iran.

== Demographics ==
=== Population ===
At the time of the 2006 National Census, the village's population was 90 in 20 households, when it was in Jayedar Rural District of the Central District. (Note: Renamed Jayedar-e Shomali Rural District) The following census in 2011 counted 68 people in 16 households. The 2016 census measured the population of the village as 66 people in 14 households.

In 2023, the rural district was renamed Jayedar-e Shomali Rural District, and the village was separated from it in the formation of Bala Geriveh District. Chutash-e Yekshanbeh was transferred to Jayedar-e Jonubi Rural District created in the new district.
