= Cham Gerdeleh =

Cham Gerdeleh or Cham Geredeleh (Persian: چمگردله) may refer to:

- Cham Gerdeleh-ye Olya
- Cham Gerdeleh-ye Sofla
- Cham Geredeleh-ye Vosta
