= Jelogir =

Jelogir or Jolowgir or Jolow Gir or Jelow Gir or Jalogir or Jelugir or Jelo Gir (Persian: جلوگير) may refer to:

- Jelogir, Ardabil
- Jelogir, Khuzestan
- Jelogir, Lorestan
- Jelogir Rural District
