= Deh-e Bozorg, Pol-e Dokhtar =

Village in Lorestan province, Iran

Deh-e Bozorg Persian: ده بزرگ
- Village
- Location within Iran
- Country: Iran
- Province: Lorestan
- County: Pol-e Dokhtar
- District: Bala Geriveh
- Rural District: Jayedar-e Jonubi

Population (2016)
  - Total: Below reporting threshold
- Time zone: UTC+3:30 (IRST)

Deh-e Bozorg (Persian: ده بزرگ) is a village in Jayedar-e Jonubi Rural District of Bala Geriveh District in Pol-e Dokhtar County, Lorestan province, Iran.

== Demographics ==
=== Population ===
At the time of the 2006 National Census, the village's population was 94 in 17 households, when it was in Jelogir Rural District of the Central District. The 2016 census measured the population of the village as below the reporting threshold.

In 2023, the rural district was separated from the district in the formation of Bala Geriveh District, and Deh-e Bozorg was transferred to Jayedar-e Jonubi Rural District created in the new district.
