= Garvazir =

Village in Lorestan province, Iran

Garvazir Persian: گروزير
- Village
- Location within Iran
- Coordinates: 33°04′50″N 47°48′25″E
- Country: Iran
- Province: Lorestan
- County: Pol-e Dokhtar
- District: Bala Geriveh
- Rural District: Jayedar-e Jonubi

Population (2016)
  - Total: Below reporting threshold
- Time zone: UTC+3:30 (IRST)

Garvazir (Persian: گروزير) (Note: Also romanized as Garvazīr) is a village in Jayedar-e Jonubi Rural District of Bala Geriveh District in Pol-e Dokhtar County, Lorestan province, Iran.

== Demographics ==
=== Population ===
At the time of the 2006 National Census, the village's population was 45 in seven households, when it was in Jayedar Rural District of the Central District. (Note: Renamed Jayedar-e Shomali Rural District) The 2016 census measured the population of the village as below the reporting threshold.

In 2023, the rural district was renamed Jayedar-e Shomali Rural District, and the village was separated from it in the formation of Bala Geriveh District. Garvazir was transferred to Jayedar-e Jonubi Rural District created in the new district.
