= Kalak Bisheh =

Kalak Bisheh (Persian: كلكبيشه) may refer to:

- Kalak Bisheh-ye Asad
- Kalak Bisheh-ye Qahramani
- Kalak Bisheh-ye Sadiq
