= Tang-e Sistan =

Village in Lorestan province, Iran

Tang-e Sistan Persian: تنگسيستان
- Village
- Location within Iran
- Coordinates: 32°58′47″N 48°08′38″E
- Country: Iran
- Province: Lorestan
- County: Pol-e Dokhtar
- District: Bala Geriveh
- Rural District: Jayedar-e Jonubi

Population (2016)
  - Total: 52
- Time zone: UTC+3:30 (IRST)

Tang-e Sistan (Persian: تنگسيستان) (Note: Also romanized as Tang-e Sīstān) is a village in Jayedar-e Jonubi Rural District of Bala Geriveh District in Pol-e Dokhtar County, Lorestan province, Iran.

== Demographics ==
=== Population ===
At the time of the 2006 National Census, the village's population was 136 in 26 households, when it was in Jelogir Rural District of the Central District. The following census in 2011 counted 100 people in 23 households. The 2016 census measured the population of the village as 52 people in 15 households.

In 2023, the rural district was separated from the district in the formation of Bala Geriveh District, and Tang-e Sistan was transferred to Jayedar-e Jonubi Rural District created in the new district.
