= Rangin Ban, Pol-e Dokhtar =

Village in Lorestan province, Iran

Rangin Ban Persian: رنگين بان
- Village
- Location within Iran
- Coordinates: 32°59′50″N 47°45′38″E
- Country: Iran
- Province: Lorestan
- County: Pol-e Dokhtar
- District: Bala Geriveh
- Rural District: Jelogir

Population (2016)
  - Total: 280
- Time zone: UTC+3:30 (IRST)

Rangin Ban (Persian: رنگين بان) (Note: Also romanized as Rangīn Bān; also known as Rangīnābād) is a village in Jelogir Rural District of Bala Geriveh District in Pol-e Dokhtar County, Lorestan province, Iran.

== Demographics ==
=== Population ===
At the time of the 2006 National Census, the village's population was 284 in 59 households, when it was in the Central District. The following census in 2011 counted 302 people in 66 households. The 2016 census measured the population of the village as 280 people in 66 households.

In 2023, the rural district was separated from the district in the formation of Bala Geriveh District.
