= Sheykh Morad =

Sheykh Morad شيخ مراد
- Village
- Location within Iran
- Coordinates: 33°10′00″N 47°48′00″E
- Country: Iran
- Province: Lorestan
- County: Pol-e Dokhtar
- Bakhsh: Central
- Rural District: Miyankuh-e Gharbi

Population (2006)
  - Total: 20
- Time zone: UTC+3:30 (IRST)
  - Summer (DST): UTC+4:30 (IRDT)

Sheykh Morad (Persian: شيخ مراد, also Romanized as Sheykh Morād) is a village in Miyankuh-e Gharbi Rural District, in the Central District of Pol-e Dokhtar County, Lorestan Province, Iran. At the 2006 census, its population was 20, in 5 families.
