= Cham Chul =

Cham Chul چم چل
- Village
- Location within Iran
- Coordinates: 33°33′14″N 47°02′41″E
- Country: Iran
- Province: Lorestan
- County: Kuhdasht
- Bakhsh: Tarhan
- Rural District: Tarhan-e Gharbi

Population (2006)
  - Total: 32
- Time zone: UTC+3:30 (IRST)
  - Summer (DST): UTC+4:30 (IRDT)

Cham Chul (Persian: چم چل, also Romanized as Cham Chūl) is a village in Tarhan-e Gharbi Rural District, Tarhan District, Kuhdasht County, Lorestan Province, Iran. At the 2006 census, its population was 32, in 5 families.
