= Sargrefteh =

Village in Lorestan province, Iran

Sargrefteh Persian: سرگرفته
- Village
- Location within Iran
- Coordinates: 32°59′22″N 47°48′30″E
- Country: Iran
- Province: Lorestan
- County: Pol-e Dokhtar
- District: Bala Geriveh
- Rural District: Jelogir

Population (2016)
  - Total: 0
- Time zone: UTC+3:30 (IRST)

Sargrefteh (Persian: سرگرفته) (Note: Also known as Tāleqānī (طالقاني)) is a village in Jelogir Rural District of Bala Geriveh District in Pol-e Dokhtar County, Lorestan province, Iran.

== Demographics ==
=== Population ===
At the time of the 2006 National Census, the village's population was 32 in five households, when it was in the Central District. The 2016 census measured the population of the village as zero.

In 2023, the rural district was separated from the district in the formation of Bala Geriveh District.
