= Kamcheh Kola =

Kamcheh Kola كمچه كلا
- Village
- Location within Iran
- Coordinates: 33°09′00″N 47°49′00″E
- Country: Iran
- Province: Lorestan
- County: Pol-e Dokhtar
- Bakhsh: Central
- Rural District: Miyankuh-e Gharbi

Population (2006)
  - Total: 33
- Time zone: UTC+3:30 (IRST)
  - Summer (DST): UTC+4:30 (IRDT)

Kamcheh Kola (Persian: كمچه كلا, also Romanized as Kamcheh Kolā) is a village in Miyankuh-e Gharbi Rural District, in the Central District of Pol-e Dokhtar County, Lorestan Province, Iran. At the 2006 census, its population was 33, in 7 families.
