= Cham Gaz =

Cham Gaz or Cham-e Gaz (Persian: چم گز) may refer to:

- Cham-e Gaz, Fars
- Cham Gaz, Lorestan
- Amirabad Cham Gaz
