= Kul Badam =

Kul Badam (Persian: كول بادام) may refer to:

- Kul Badam-e Nurmorad
- Kul Badam-e Yavar
