= Zuleh =

Zuleh (Persian: زوله) may refer to:

- Zuleh, Kermanshah
- Zuleh, Lorestan
