= Dom Zalab =

Dom Zalab دم زلاب
- Village
- Country: Iran
- Province: Lorestan
- County: Pol-e Dokhtar
- Bakhsh: Central
- Rural District: Malavi

Population (2006)
  - Total: 27
- Time zone: UTC+3:30 (IRST)
  - Summer (DST): UTC+4:30 (IRDT)

Dom Zalab (Persian: دم زلاب, also Romanized as Dom Zalāb) is a village in Malavi Rural District, in the Central District of Pol-e Dokhtar County, Lorestan Province, Iran. At the 2006 census, its population was 27, in 5 families.
