= Chapit =

Chapit (Persian: چاپيت) may refer to:

- Chapit-e Olya
- Chapit-e Sofla
