= Jolgeh-ye Khalaj =

Jolgeh-ye Khalaj or Jolgeh Khalaj (Persian: جلگه خلج) may refer to:

- Jolgeh-ye Khalaj-e Olya
- Jolgeh-ye Khalaj-e Sofla
