= Owlad-e Naqiabad =

Owlad-e Naqiabad اولاد نقي آباد
- Village
- Location within Iran
- Coordinates: 33°28′52″N 47°11′50″E
- Country: Iran
- Province: Lorestan
- County: Kuhdasht
- Bakhsh: Tarhan
- Rural District: Tarhan-e Sharqi

Population (2006)
  - Total: 203
- Time zone: UTC+3:30 (IRST)
  - Summer (DST): UTC+4:30 (IRDT)

Owlad-e Naqiabad (Persian: اولاد نقي آباد, also Romanized as Owlād-e Naqīābād) is a village in Tarhan-e Sharqi Rural District, Tarhan District, Kuhdasht County, Lorestan Province, Iran. At the 2006 census, its population was 203, in 38 families.
