= Aslani Mohammad Reza =

Aslani Mohammad Reza اصلاني محمدرضا
- Village
- Country: Iran
- Province: Lorestan
- County: Pol-e Dokhtar
- Bakhsh: Central
- Rural District: Miyankuh-e Gharbi

Population (2006)
  - Total: 80
- Time zone: UTC+3:30 (IRST)
  - Summer (DST): UTC+4:30 (IRDT)

Aslani Mohammad Reza (Persian: اصلاني محمدرضا, also Romanized as Āṣlānī Moḥammad Rez̤ā) is a village in Miyankuh-e Gharbi Rural District, in the Central District of Pol-e Dokhtar County, Lorestan Province, Iran. At the 2006 census, its population was 80, in 14 families.
