= Kul Chap =

Village in Lorestan province, Iran

Kul Chap Persian: كول چپ
- Village
- Location within Iran
- Country: Iran
- Province: Lorestan
- County: Pol-e Dokhtar
- District: Bala Geriveh
- Rural District: Jelogir

Population (2016)
  - Total: Below reporting threshold
- Time zone: UTC+3:30 (IRST)

Kul Chap (Persian: كول چپ) (Note: Also romanized as Kūl Chap) is a village in Jelogir Rural District of Bala Geriveh District in Pol-e Dokhtar County, Lorestan province, Iran.

== Demographics ==
=== Population ===
At the time of the 2006 National Census, the village's population was 57 in 14 households, when it was in the Central District. The following census in 2011 counted 88 people in 22 households. The 2016 census measured the population of the village as below the reporting threshold.

In 2023, the rural district was separated from the district in the formation of Bala Geriveh District.
