= Ruband-e Jolgeh-ye Khalaj =

Ruband-e Jolgeh-ye Khalaj روبندجلگه خلج
- Village
- Location within Iran
- Coordinates: 33°16′09″N 47°49′22″E
- Country: Iran
- Province: Lorestan
- County: Pol-e Dokhtar
- Bakhsh: Central
- Rural District: Malavi

Population (2006)
  - Total: 99
- Time zone: UTC+3:30 (IRST)
  - Summer (DST): UTC+4:30 (IRDT)

Ruband-e Jolgeh-ye Khalaj (Persian: روبندجلگه خلج, also Romanized as Rūband-e Jolgeh-ye Khalaj) is a village in Malavi Rural District, in the Central District of Pol-e Dokhtar County, Lorestan Province, Iran. At the 2006 census, its population was 99, in 21 families.
