= Baba Bahram =

Baba Bahram بابابهرام
- Village
- Location within Iran
- Coordinates: 33°14′18″N 47°53′38″E
- Country: Iran
- Province: Lorestan
- County: Pol-e Dokhtar
- Bakhsh: Central
- Rural District: Malavi

Population (2006)
  - Total: 109
- Time zone: UTC+3:30 (IRST)
  - Summer (DST): UTC+4:30 (IRDT)

Baba Bahram (Persian: بابابهرام, also Romanized as Bābā Bahrām) is a village in Malavi Rural District, in the Central District of Pol-e Dokhtar County, Lorestan Province, Iran. At the 2006 census, its population was 109, in 26 families.
