= Akhurrakhash =

Village in Lorestan province, Iran

Akhurrakhash Persian: اخوررخش
- Village
- Location within Iran
- Country: Iran
- Province: Lorestan
- County: Pol-e Dokhtar
- District: Bala Geriveh
- Rural District: Jelogir

Population (2016)
  - Total: 47
- Time zone: UTC+3:30 (IRST)

Akhurrakhash (Persian: اخوررخش) (Note: Also romanized as Ākhūrrakhash and Ākhvorrash; also known as Akhor Vakhsh, Ākhowr, Akhowr Khash, Ākhowr Khash, and Al Khawr) is a village in Jelogir Rural District of Bala Geriveh District in Pol-e Dokhtar County, Lorestan province, Iran.

== Demographics ==
=== Population ===
At the time of the 2006 National Census, the village's population was 35 in seven households, when it was in the Central District. The following census in 2011 counted 33 people in six households. The 2016 census measured the population of the village as 47 people in 13 households.

In 2023, the rural district was separated from the district in the formation of Bala Geriveh District.
