= Guri Sabz Babakhan =

Guri Sabz Babakhan گوري سبزباباخان
- Village
- Country: Iran
- Province: Lorestan
- County: Pol-e Dokhtar
- Bakhsh: Central
- Rural District: Miyankuh-e Gharbi

Population (2006)
  - Total: 13
- Time zone: UTC+3:30 (IRST)
  - Summer (DST): UTC+4:30 (IRDT)

Guri Sabz Babakhan (Persian: گوري سبزباباخان, also romanized as Gūrī Sabz Bābākhān) is a village in Miyankuh-e Gharbi Rural District, in the Central District of Pol-e Dokhtar County, Lorestan Province, Iran. At the 2006 census, its population was 13, in 4 families.
