= Mohammad Karim Kushki =

Mohammad Karim Kushki محمدكريم كوشكي
- Village
- Location within Iran
- Coordinates: 33°28′51″N 47°08′19″E
- Country: Iran
- Province: Lorestan
- County: Kuhdasht
- Bakhsh: Tarhan
- Rural District: Tarhan-e Gharbi

Population (2006)
  - Total: 247
- Time zone: UTC+3:30 (IRST)
  - Summer (DST): UTC+4:30 (IRDT)

Mohammad Karim Kushki (Persian: محمدكريم كوشكي, also Romanized as Moḥammad Karīm Kūshḵī; also known as Mohammadkarim) is a village in Tarhan-e Gharbi Rural District, Tarhan District, Kuhdasht County, Lorestan Province, Iran. At the 2006 census, its population was 247, in 52 families.
