= Sarab Mahmudvand =

Neighborhood in Lorestan province, Iran

Sarab Mahmudvand Persian: سراب محمودوند
- Neighborhood
- Country: Iran
- Province: Lorestan
- County: Pol-e Dokhtar
- District: Central
- City: Sarab Hammam

Population (2006)
  - Total: 1,900
- Time zone: UTC+3:30 (IRST)

Sarab Mahmudvand (Persian: سراب محمودوند) (Note: Also romanized as Sarāb Maḥmūdvand) is a neighborhood in the city of Sarab Hammam in the Central District of Pol-e Dokhtar County, Lorestan province, Iran.

== Demographics ==
=== Population ===
At the time of the 2006 National Census, Sarab Mahmudvand's population was 1,900 in 420 households, when it was a village in Jayedar Rural District. (Note: Renamed Jayedar-e Shomali Rural District) After the census, the villages of Sarab-e Ganj Ali and Sarab Mahmudvand merged with the village of Sarab Hammam, which was converted to a city in 2020.
