= Darreh Naqi =

Village in Lorestan province, Iran

Darreh Naqi Persian: دره نقي
- Village
- Location within Iran
- Coordinates: 32°59′56″N 47°44′36″E
- Country: Iran
- Province: Lorestan
- County: Pol-e Dokhtar
- District: Bala Geriveh
- Rural District: Jelogir

Population (2016)
  - Total: 47
- Time zone: UTC+3:30 (IRST)

Darreh Naqi (Persian: دره نقي) (Note: Also romanized as Darreh Naqī) is a village in Jelogir Rural District of Bala Geriveh District in Pol-e Dokhtar County, Lorestan province, Iran.

== Demographics ==
=== Population ===
At the time of the 2006 National Census, the village's population was 54 in 10 households, when it was in the Central District. The following census in 2011 counted 49 people in 12 households. The 2016 census measured the population of the village as 47 people in 14 households.

In 2023, the rural district was separated from the district in the formation of Bala Geriveh District.
