= Sar Qabrestan =

Sar Qabrestan (Persian: سر قبرستان) may refer to various villages in Iran:

- Sar Qabrestan-e Olya Shamal
- Sar Qabrestan-e Sofla Shamal
