= Darreh Khazineh =

Village in Lorestan province, Iran

Darreh Khazineh Persian: دره خزينه
- Village
- Location within Iran
- Country: Iran
- Province: Lorestan
- County: Pol-e Dokhtar
- District: Bala Geriveh
- Rural District: Jelogir

Population (2016)
  - Total: 36
- Time zone: UTC+3:30 (IRST)

Darreh Khazineh (Persian: دره خزينه) (Note: Also romanized as Darreh Khazīneh; also known as Darreh Qarzīneh) is a village in Jelogir Rural District of Bala Geriveh District in Pol-e Dokhtar County, Lorestan province, Iran.

== Demographics ==
=== Population ===
At the time of the 2006 National Census, the village's population was 63 in 13 households, when it was in the Central District. The following census in 2011 counted 47 people in 10 households. The 2016 census measured the population of the village as 36 people in eight households.

In 2023, the rural district was separated from the district in the formation of Bala Geriveh District.
