= Cham Mehr =

Cham Mehr or Cham-e Mehr (Persian: چممهرا) may refer to:

- Cham Mehr-e Bala
- Cham Mehr-e Pain
