= Sarab-e Ganj Ali =

Sarab-e Ganj Ali and Sarab-e Ganj'ali and Sarab Ganjali (Persian: سرابگنجعلي) may refer to:

- Sarab-e Ganj Ali, Khorramabad
- Sarab-e Ganj Ali, Pol-e Dokhtar
