= Borj-e Kabud =

Village in Lorestan province, Iran

Borj-e Kabud Persian: برج کبود
- Village
- Location within Iran
- Coordinates: 33°00′02″N 47°48′18″E
- Country: Iran
- Province: Lorestan
- County: Pol-e Dokhtar
- District: Bala Geriveh
- Rural District: Jelogir

Population (2016)
  - Total: 232
- Time zone: UTC+3:30 (IRST)

Borj-e Kabud (Persian: برج کبود) (Note: Also romanized as Borj-e Kabūd; also known as Rūstāyī Ābūẕar (روستاي ابوذر)) is a village in Jelogir Rural District of Bala Geriveh District in Pol-e Dokhtar County, Lorestan province, Iran.

== Demographics ==
=== Population ===
At the time of the 2006 National Census, the village's population was 188 in 39 households, when it was in the Central District. The following census in 2011 counted 209 people in 51 households. The 2016 census measured the population of the village as 232 people in 61 households.

In 2023, the rural district was separated from the district in the formation of Bala Geriveh District.
