= Jelogir, Lorestan =

Village in Lorestan province, Iran

Jelogir Persian: جلوگير
- Village
- Location within Iran
- Coordinates: 32°58′41″N 47°48′26″E
- Country: Iran
- Province: Lorestan
- County: Pol-e Dokhtar
- District: Bala Geriveh
- Rural District: Jelogir

Population (2016)
  - Total: 445
- Time zone: UTC+3:30 (IRST)

Jelogir (Persian: جلوگير) (Note: Also romanized as Jalogīr, Jelo Gīr, Jelow Gīr, Jelūgīr, and Jolow Gīr) is a village in, and the capital of, Jelogir Rural District in Bala Geriveh District of Pol-e Dokhtar County, Lorestan province, Iran. The previous capital of the rural district was the village of Pa Alam, now in Jayedar-e Jonubi Rural District.

== Demographics ==
=== Population ===
At the time of the 2006 National Census, the village's population was 535 in 115 households, when it was in the Central District. The following census in 2011 counted 538 people in 133 households. The 2016 census measured the population of the village as 445 people in 135 households.

In 2023, the rural district was separated from the district in the formation of Bala Geriveh District.
