= Cheshmeh Gush Latif =

Cheshmeh Gush Latif چشمه گش لطيف
- Village
- Location within Iran
- Coordinates: 33°10′45″N 47°44′27″E
- Country: Iran
- Province: Lorestan
- County: Pol-e Dokhtar
- Bakhsh: Central
- Rural District: Miyankuh-e Gharbi

Population (2006)
  - Total: 60
- Time zone: UTC+3:30 (IRST)
  - Summer (DST): UTC+4:30 (IRDT)

Cheshmeh Gush Latif (Persian: چشمه گش لطيف, also Romanized as Cheshmeh Gūsh Laṭīf; also known as Cheshmeh Gūsh and Cheshmeh Gosh) is a village in Miyankuh-e Gharbi Rural District, in the Central District of Pol-e Dokhtar County, Lorestan Province, Iran. At the 2006 census, its population was 60, in 11 families.
