= Guri Sabz =

Gūr-i Sabz گور سبز
- Village
- Location within Iran
- Coordinates: 33°08′00″N 47°51′00″E
- Country: Iran
- Province: Lorestan
- County: Pol-e Dokhtar
- Bakhsh: Central
- Rural District: Miyankuh-e Gharbi

Population (2006)
  - Total: 37
- Time zone: UTC+3:30 (IRST)
  - Summer (DST): UTC+4:30 (IRDT)

Gur-i Sabz (Persian: گورِ سبز, also Romanized as Gūr-i Sabz, with Persian gūr 'grave, tomb,' and sabz 'green,' and the possessive/adjectival enclitic/connecting suffix [-e], meaning "the Green Grave") is a village in Miyankuh-e Gharbi Rural District, in the Central District of Pol-e Dokhtar County, Lorestan Province, Iran. At the 2006 census, its population was 37, in 7 families.
