= Pasgolam =

Village in Lorestan province, Iran

Pasgolam Persian: پس گلم
- Village
- Location within Iran
- Coordinates: 32°58′16″N 48°09′35″E
- Country: Iran
- Province: Lorestan
- County: Pol-e Dokhtar
- District: Bala Geriveh
- Rural District: Jelogir

Population (2016)
  - Total: 50
- Time zone: UTC+3:30 (IRST)

Pasgolam (Persian: پس گلم) is a village in Jelogir Rural District of Bala Geriveh District in Pol-e Dokhtar County, Lorestan province, Iran.

== Demographics ==
=== Population ===
At the time of the 2006 National Census, the village's population was 66 in 14 households, when it was in the Central District. The following census in 2011 counted 80 people in 17 households. The 2016 census measured the population of the village as 50 people in 12 households.

In 2023, the rural district was separated from the district in the formation of Bala Geriveh District.
