= Takht Ab-e Gerdkaneh =

Takht Ab-e Gerdkaneh تخت اب گردكانه
- Village
- Location within Iran
- Coordinates: 33°04′03″N 48°08′35″E
- Country: Iran
- Province: Lorestan
- County: Pol-e Dokhtar
- Bakhsh: Central
- Rural District: Miyankuh-e Gharbi

Population (2006)
  - Total: 64
- Time zone: UTC+3:30 (IRST)
  - Summer (DST): UTC+4:30 (IRDT)

Takht Ab-e Gerdkaneh (Persian: تخت اب گردكانه, also Romanized as Takht Āb-e Gerdḵāneh) is a village in Miyankuh-e Gharbi Rural District, in the Central District of Pol-e Dokhtar County, Lorestan Province, Iran. At the 2006 census, its population was 64, in 13 families.
