= Pa Alam =

Village in Lorestan province, Iran

Pa Alam Persian: پاعلم
- Village
- Location within Iran
- Coordinates: 32°51′14″N 47°59′48″E
- Country: Iran
- Province: Lorestan
- County: Pol-e Dokhtar
- District: Bala Geriveh
- Rural District: Jayedar-e Jonubi

Population (2016)
  - Total: 1,010
- Time zone: UTC+3:30 (IRST)
- Area code: 0663226
- Website: paalam.ir

Pa Alam (Persian: پاعلم) (Note: Also romanized as Pā ‘Alam; also known as Pā ‘Alam-e Shāh Aḩmad, Pol Tang, Pol-e Tang (پل تنگ), Pol-e-Zāl, and Pul-ī-Tang) is a village in Jayedar-e Jonubi Rural District of Bala Geriveh District in Pol-e Dokhtar County, Lorestan province, Iran. It was the capital of Jelogir Rural District until its capital was transferred to the village of Jelogir.

== Demographics ==
=== Population ===
At the time of the 2006 National Census, the village's population was 1,487 in 301 households, when it was in Jelogir Rural District of the Central District. The following census in 2011 counted 1,228 people in 303 households. The 2016 census measured the population of the village as 1,010 people in 279 households, the most populous in its rural district.

In 2023, the rural district was separated from the district in the formation of Bala Geriveh District, and Pa Alam was transferred to Jayedar-e Jonubi Rural District created in the new district.
