= Taleqan, Pol-e Dokhtar =

Village in Lorestan province, Iran

Taleqan Persian: طالقان
- Village
- Country: Iran
- Province: Lorestan
- County: Pol-e Dokhtar
- District: Bala Geriveh
- Rural District: Jelogir

Population (2016)
  - Total: 110
- Time zone: UTC+3:30 (IRST)

Taleqan (Persian: طالقان) (Note: Also romanized as Tāleqān) is a village in Jelogir Rural District of Bala Geriveh District in Pol-e Dokhtar County, Lorestan province, Iran.

== Demographics ==
=== Population ===
At the time of the 2006 National Census, the village's population was 100 in 18 households, when it was in the Central District. The following census in 2011 counted 109 people in 24 households. The 2016 census measured the population of the village as 110 people in 30 households.

In 2023, the rural district was separated from the district in the formation of Bala Geriveh District.
