= Chin Zal =

Village in Lorestan province, Iran

Chin Zal Persian: چين زال
- Village
- Location within Iran
- Coordinates: 32°52′21″N 48°06′45″E
- Country: Iran
- Province: Lorestan
- County: Pol-e Dokhtar
- District: Bala Geriveh
- Rural District: Jelogir

Population (2016)
  - Total: 0
- Time zone: UTC+3:30 (IRST)

Chin Zal (Persian: چين زال) (Note: Also romanized as Chīn Zāl and Chīnzāl) is a village in Jelogir Rural District of Bala Geriveh District in Pol-e Dokhtar County, Lorestan province, Iran.

== Demographics ==
=== Population ===
At the time of the 2006 National Census, the village's population was 132 in 27 households, when it was in the Central District. The following census in 2011 counted 19 people in five households. The 2016 census measured the population of the village as zero.

In 2023, the rural district was separated from the district in the formation of Bala Geriveh District.
