= Sorkh Mal Nazanin =

Sorkh Mal Nazanin سرخ مال نازنين
- Village
- Country: Iran
- Province: Lorestan
- County: Pol-e Dokhtar
- Bakhsh: Central
- Rural District: Miyankuh-e Gharbi

Population (2006)
  - Total: 124
- Time zone: UTC+3:30 (IRST)
  - Summer (DST): UTC+4:30 (IRDT)

Sorkh Mal Nazanin (Persian: سرخ مال نازنين, also Romanized as Sorkh Māl Nāzanīn) is a village in Miyankuh-e Gharbi Rural District, in the Central District of Pol-e Dokhtar County, Lorestan Province, Iran. At the 2006 census, its population was 124, in 22 families.
