= Leylan Cham =

Leylan Cham ليلان چم
- Village
- Location within Iran
- Coordinates: 33°17′00″N 47°48′00″E
- Country: Iran
- Province: Lorestan
- County: Pol-e Dokhtar
- Bakhsh: Central
- Rural District: Malavi

Population (2006)
  - Total: 248
- Time zone: UTC+3:30 (IRST)
  - Summer (DST): UTC+4:30 (IRDT)

Leylan Cham (Persian: ليلان چم, also Romanized as Leylān Cham) is a village in Malavi Rural District, in the Central District of Pol-e Dokhtar County, Lorestan Province, Iran. At the 2006 census, its population was 248, in 43 families.
