= Kul Badam-e Nurmorad =

Kul Badam-e Nurmorad كول بادام نورمراد
- Village
- Location within Iran
- Coordinates: 33°34′50″N 47°00′20″E
- Country: Iran
- Province: Lorestan
- County: Kuhdasht
- Bakhsh: Tarhan
- Rural District: Tarhan-e Gharbi

Population (2006)
  - Total: 46
- Time zone: UTC+3:30 (IRST)
  - Summer (DST): UTC+4:30 (IRDT)

Kul Badam-e Nurmorad (Persian: كول بادام نورمراد, also Romanized as Kūl Bādām-e Nūrmorād; also known as Kūl Bādām) is a village in Tarhan-e Gharbi Rural District, Tarhan District, Kuhdasht County, Lorestan Province, Iran. At the 2006 census, its population was 46, in 10 families.
