= Cham Gaz, Lorestan =

Village in Lorestan province, Iran

Cham Gaz Persian: چم گز
- Village
- Location within Iran
- Coordinates: 32°57′01″N 47°49′55″E
- Country: Iran
- Province: Lorestan
- County: Pol-e Dokhtar
- District: Bala Geriveh
- Rural District: Jelogir

Population (2016)
  - Total: 303
- Time zone: UTC+3:30 (IRST)

Cham Gaz (Persian: چم گز) (Note: Also romanized as Cham-e Gaz) is a village in Jelogir Rural District of Bala Geriveh District in Pol-e Dokhtar County, Lorestan province, Iran.

== Demographics ==
=== Population ===
At the time of the 2006 National Census, the village's population was 354 in 79 households, when it was in the Central District. The following census in 2011 counted 325 people in 83 households. The 2016 census measured the population of the village as 303 people in 77 households.

In 2023, the rural district was separated from the district in the formation of Bala Geriveh District.
