= Gol Gol-e Sofla, Lorestan =

Village in Lorestan province, Iran

Gol Gol-e Sofla Persian: گل گل سفلي
- Village
- Location within Iran
- Coordinates: 33°13′39″N 47°44′19″E
- Country: Iran
- Province: Lorestan
- County: Pol-e Dokhtar
- District: Central
- Rural District: Malavi

Population (2016)
  - Total: 696
- Time zone: UTC+3:30 (IRST)

Gol Gol-e Sofla (Persian: گل گل سفلي) (Note: Also romanized as Gol Gol-e Soflá, also known as Gol Gol and Gulgul) is a village in Malavi Rural District of the Central District in Pol-e Dokhtar County, Lorestan province, Iran.

== Demographics ==
=== Population ===
At the time of the 2006 National Census, the village's population was 742 in 178 households. The following census in 2011 counted 753 people in 210 households. The 2016 census measured the population of the village as 696 people in 217 households.
