= Posht Tang-e Khushab =

Posht Tang-e Khushab پشت تنگ خوشاب
- Village
- Location within Iran
- Coordinates: 33°09′00″N 47°57′00″E
- Country: Iran
- Province: Lorestan
- County: Pol-e Dokhtar
- Bakhsh: Central
- Rural District: Miyankuh-e Gharbi

Population (2006)
  - Total: 16
- Time zone: UTC+3:30 (IRST)
  - Summer (DST): UTC+4:30 (IRDT)

Posht Tang-e Khushab (Persian: پشت تنگ خوشاب, also Romanized as Posht Tang-e Khūshāb) is a village in Miyankuh-e Gharbi Rural District, in the Central District of Pol-e Dokhtar County, Lorestan Province, Iran. At the 2006 census, its population was 16, in 6 families.
