= Baba Zeyd, Lorestan =

Village in Lorestan province, Iran

Baba Zeyd Persian: بابازيد
- Village
- Location within Iran
- Coordinates: 33°12′58″N 47°44′08″E
- Country: Iran
- Province: Lorestan
- County: Pol-e Dokhtar
- District: Central
- Rural District: Malavi

Population (2016)
  - Total: 532
- Time zone: UTC+3:30 (IRST)

Baba Zeyd (Persian: بابازيد) (Note: Also romanized as Bābā Zeyd; also known as Emām Zādeh, Emāmzādeh Bābā Zeyd, Imāmzādeh Bāba Zai, and Imāmzādeh Bāba Zaid) is a village in Malavi Rural District of the Central District in Pol-e Dokhtar County, Lorestan province, Iran.

== Demographics ==
=== Population ===
At the time of the 2006 National Census, the village's population was 592 in 118 households. The following census in 2011 counted 559 people in 161 households. The 2016 census measured the population of the village as 532 people in 167 households.
