= Malek Ali =

Village in Lorestan, Iran

Malek Ali ملک علي
- Village
- Location within Iran
- Coordinates: 33°25′35″N 47°13′12″E
- Country: Iran
- Province: Lorestan
- County: Kuhdasht
- Bakhsh: Tarhan
- Rural District: Tarhan-e Sharqi

Population (2006)
  - Total: 135
- Time zone: UTC+3:30 (IRST)
  - Summer (DST): UTC+4:30 (IRDT)

Malek Ali (Persian: ملک علي, also Romanized as Malek ʿAlī; also known as Posht Tang-e Soflá and Poshteh Tang-e Pā’īn) is a village in Tarhan-e Sharqi Rural District, Tarhan District, Kuhdasht County, Lorestan Province, Iran. At the 2006 census, its population was 135, in 22 families.
