= Takht Ab, Lorestan =

Village in Lorestan province, Iran

Takht Ab Persian: تخت اب
- Village
- Location within Iran
- Coordinates: 33°04′01″N 48°08′34″E
- Country: Iran
- Province: Lorestan
- County: Pol-e Dokhtar
- District: Central
- Rural District: Miyankuh-e Gharbi

Population (2016)
  - Total: 110
- Time zone: UTC+3:30 (IRST)

Takht Ab (Persian: تخت اب) (Note: Also romanized as Takht Āb) is a village in Miyankuh-e Gharbi Rural District of the Central District in Pol-e Dokhtar County, Lorestan province, Iran.

== Demographics ==
=== Population ===
At the time of the 2006 National Census, the village's population was 123 in 31 households. The following census in 2011 counted 21 people in six households. The 2016 census measured the population of the village as 110 people in 27 households.
