= Qebleh, Lorestan =

Village in Lorestan province, Iran

Qebleh Persian: قبله
- Village
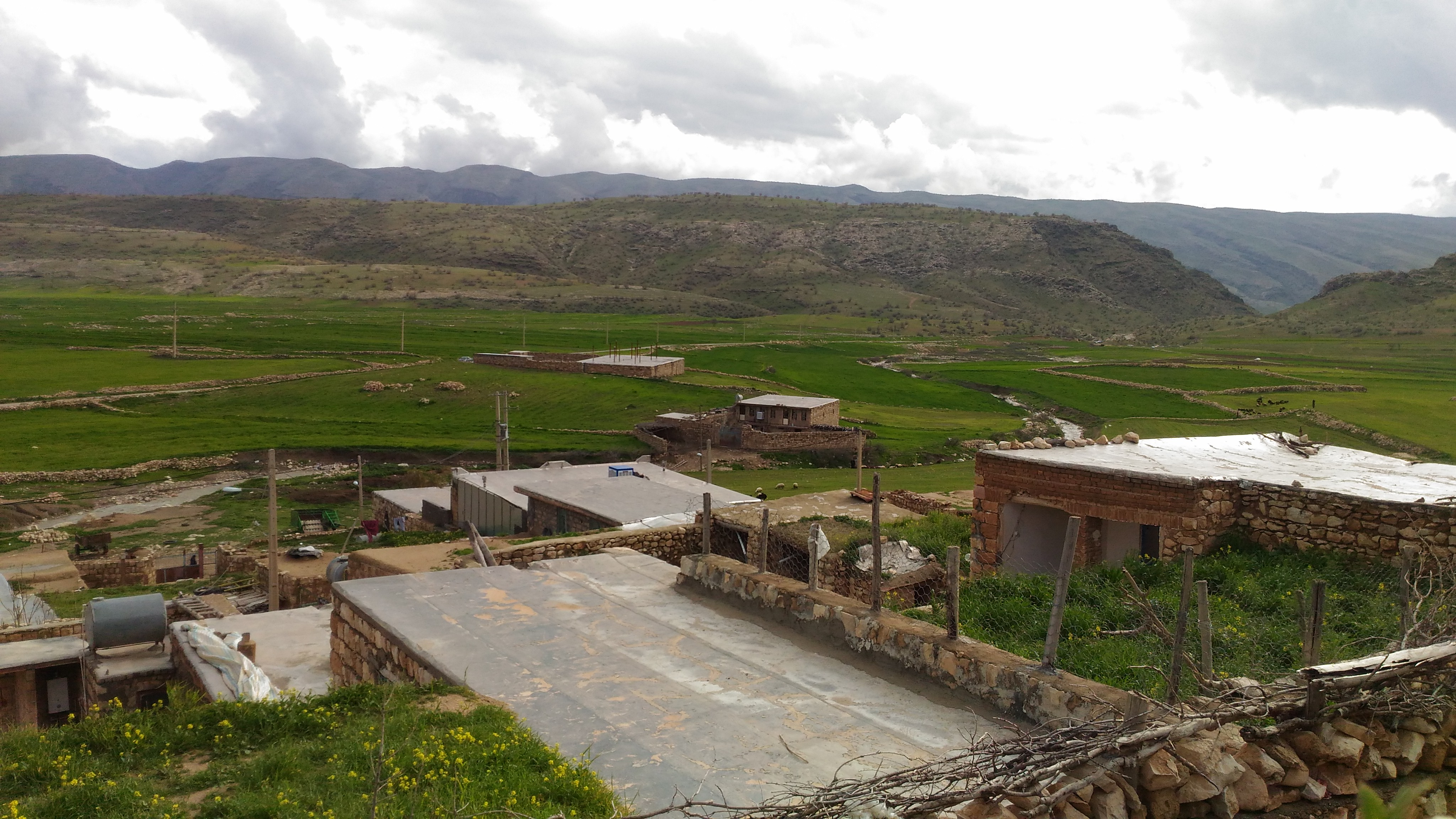
- Qebleh village

- Location within Iran
- Coordinates: 33°33′16″N 47°07′39″E
- Country: Iran
- Province: Lorestan
- County: Kuhdasht
- District: Tarhan
- Rural District: Tarhan-e Gharbi

Population (2016)
  - Total: 545
- Time zone: UTC+3:30 (IRST)

Qebleh (Persian: قبله) (Note: Also known as Qībleh) is a village in Tarhan-e Gharbi Rural District of Tarhan District in Kuhdasht County, Lorestan province, Iran.

== Demographics ==
=== Population ===
At the time of the 2006 National Census, the village's population was 750 in 146 households. The following census in 2011 counted 767 people in 177 households. The 2016 census measured the population of the village as 545 people in 139 households.
