= Vashian-e Nosrati =

Vashian-e Nosrati واشيان نصرتي
- Village
- Country: Iran
- Province: Lorestan
- County: Pol-e Dokhtar
- Bakhsh: Central
- Rural District: Miyankuh-e Gharbi

Population (2006)
  - Total: 78
- Time zone: UTC+3:30 (IRST)
  - Summer (DST): UTC+4:30 (IRDT)

Vashian-e Nosrati (Persian: واشيان نصرتي, also Romanized as Vāshīān-e Noṣratī) is a village in Miyankuh-e Gharbi Rural District, in the Central District of Pol-e Dokhtar County, Lorestan Province, Iran. At the 2006 census, its population was 78, in 16 families.
