= Dulabi-ye Badamak =

Village in Lorestan province, Iran

Dulabi-ye Badamak Persian: دولابي بادامك
- Village
- Location within Iran
- Coordinates: 33°09′06″N 47°58′32″E
- Country: Iran
- Province: Lorestan
- County: Pol-e Dokhtar
- District: Central
- Rural District: Miyankuh-e Gharbi

Population (2016)
  - Total: 119
- Time zone: UTC+3:30 (IRST)

Dulabi-ye Badamak (Persian: دولابي بادامك) (Note: Also romanized as Dūlābī-ye Bādāmak; also known as Bādāmak) is a village in Miyankuh-e Gharbi Rural District of the Central District in Pol-e Dokhtar County, Lorestan province, Iran.

== Demographics ==
=== Population ===
At the time of the 2006 National Census, the village's population was 148 in 39 households. The following census in 2011 counted 115 people in 35 households. The 2016 census measured the population of the village as 119 people in 35 households.
