= Cham Rastamian =

Village in Lorestan province, Iran

Cham Rastamian Persian: چم رستميان
- Village
- Location within Iran
- Coordinates: 33°08′32″N 47°28′42″E
- Country: Iran
- Province: Lorestan
- County: Pol-e Dokhtar
- District: Central
- Rural District: Jayedar-e Shomali

Population (2016)
  - Total: 106
- Time zone: UTC+3:30 (IRST)

Cham Rastamian (Persian: چم رستميان) (Note: Also romanized as Cham Rastamīān) is a village in Jayedar-e Shomali Rural District (Note: Formerly Jayedar Rural District) of the Central District in Pol-e Dokhtar County, Lorestan province, Iran.

== Demographics ==
=== Population ===
At the time of the 2006 National Census, the village's population was 46 in eight households. The following census in 2011 counted 10 people in four households. The 2016 census measured the population of the village as 106 people in 28 households.
