= Paran Parviz =

Village in Lorestan province, Iran

Paran Parviz Persian: پران پرويز
- Village
- Location within Iran
- Coordinates: 33°14′26″N 47°43′01″E
- Country: Iran
- Province: Lorestan
- County: Pol-e Dokhtar
- District: Central
- Rural District: Malavi

Population (2016)
  - Total: 1,165
- Time zone: UTC+3:30 (IRST)

Paran Parviz (Persian: پران پرويز) (Note: Also romanized as Parān Parvīz; also known as Eslāmābād-e Yarān Parvīz) is a village in Malavi Rural District of the Central District in Pol-e Dokhtar County, Lorestan province, Iran.

== Demographics ==
=== Population ===
At the time of the 2006 National Census, the village's population was 996 in 213 households. The following census in 2011 counted 1,110 people in 303 households. The 2016 census measured the population of the village as 1,165 people in 341 households.
