= Tang-e Kabud-e Golabi =

Village in Lorestan province, Iran

Tang-e Kabud-e Golabi Persian: تنگ کبود گلابي
- Village
- Location within Iran
- Coordinates: 33°30′41″N 47°09′04″E
- Country: Iran
- Province: Lorestan
- County: Kuhdasht
- District: Tarhan
- Rural District: Tarhan-e Gharbi

Population (2016)
  - Total: 368
- Time zone: UTC+3:30 (IRST)

Tang-e Kabud-e Golabi (Persian: تنگ کبود گلابي) (Note: Also romanized as Tang-e Kabūd-e Golābī; formerly known as Tang-e Kabud (تنگ کبود), also romanized as Tang-e Kabūd) is a village in Tarhan-e Gharbi Rural District of Tarhan District in Kuhdasht County, Lorestan province, Iran.

== Demographics ==
=== Population ===
At the time of the 2006 National Census, the village's population, as Tang-e Kabud, was 630 in 124 households. The following census in 2011 counted 545 people in 123 households, by which time the village was listed as Tang-e Kabud-e Golabi. The 2016 census measured the population of the village as 368 people in 95 households.
