= Meydan-e Bozorg =

Village in Lorestan province, Iran

Meydan-e Bozorg Persian: ميدان بزرگ
- Village
- Location within Iran
- Coordinates: 33°10′41″N 47°31′18″E
- Country: Iran
- Province: Lorestan
- County: Pol-e Dokhtar
- District: Central
- Rural District: Jayedar-e Shomali

Population (2016)
  - Total: 639
- Time zone: UTC+3:30 (IRST)

Meydan-e Bozorg (Persian: ميدان بزرگ) (Note: Also romanized as Meydān-e Bozorg) is a village in Jayedar-e Shomali Rural District (Note: Formerly Jayedar Rural District) of the Central District in Pol-e Dokhtar County, Lorestan province, Iran.

== Demographics ==
=== Population ===
At the time of the 2006 National Census, the village's population was 618 in 134 households. The following census in 2011 counted 727 people in 173 households. The 2016 census measured the population of the village as 639 people in 170 households.
