= Posht Tang-e Sofla Seyyed Reza =

Village in Lorestan, Iran

Posht Tang-e Sofla Seyyed Reza پشت تنگ سفلي صيدرضا
- Village
- Country: Iran
- Province: Lorestan
- County: Kuhdasht
- Bakhsh: Tarhan
- Rural District: Tarhan-e Sharqi

Population (2006)
  - Total: 180
- Time zone: UTC+3:30 (IRST)
  - Summer (DST): UTC+4:30 (IRDT)

Posht Tang-e Sofla Seyyed Reza (Persian: پشت تنگ سفلي صيدرضا, also Romanized as Posht Tang-e Soflá Seyyed Rez̤ā) is a village in Tarhan-e Sharqi Rural District, Tarhan District, Kuhdasht County, Lorestan Province, Iran. At the 2006 census, its population was 180, in 36 families.
