= Khersdar-e Olya =

Khersdar-e Olya خرسدرعليا
- Village
- Location within Iran
- Coordinates: 33°12′55″N 47°43′55″E
- Country: Iran
- Province: Lorestan
- County: Pol-e Dokhtar
- Bakhsh: Central
- Rural District: Malavi

Population (2006)
  - Total: 381
- Time zone: UTC+3:30 (IRST)
  - Summer (DST): UTC+4:30 (IRDT)

Khersdar-e Olya (Persian: خرسدرعليا, also Romanized as Khersdar-e ‘Olyā; also known as Khersdar) is a village in Malavi Rural District, in the Central District of Pol-e Dokhtar County, Lorestan Province, Iran. At the 2006 census, its population was 381, in 85 families.
