= Seyyed Karim-e Kushki =

Village in Lorestan province, Iran

Seyyed Karim-e Kushki Persian: صيدكريم كوشكي
- Village
- Location within Iran
- Coordinates: 33°28′54″N 47°09′56″E
- Country: Iran
- Province: Lorestan
- County: Kuhdasht
- District: Tarhan
- Rural District: Tarhan-e Gharbi

Population (2016)
  - Total: 585
- Time zone: UTC+3:30 (IRST)

Seyyed Karim-e Kushki (Persian: صيدكريم كوشكي) (Note: Also romanized as Seyyed Karīm Kūshkī and Seyyed Karīm-e Kūshkī; also known as Kūshkī) is a village in Tarhan-e Gharbi Rural District of Tarhan District in Kuhdasht County, Lorestan province, Iran.

== Demographics ==
=== Population ===
At the time of the 2006 National Census, the village's population was 1,052 in 205 households. The following census in 2011 counted 847 people in 196 households. The 2016 census measured the population of the village as 585 people in 168 households.
