= Cham Qaleh, Pol-e Dokhtar =

Village in Lorestan province, Iran

Cham Qaleh Persian: چم قلعه
- Village
- Location within Iran
- Coordinates: 33°08′19″N 47°40′30″E
- Country: Iran
- Province: Lorestan
- County: Pol-e Dokhtar
- District: Central
- Rural District: Jayedar-e Shomali

Population (2016)
  - Total: 115
- Time zone: UTC+3:30 (IRST)

Cham Qaleh (Persian: چم قلعه) (Note: Also romanized as Cham Qal‘eh) is a village in Jayedar-e Shomali Rural District (Note: Formerly Jayedar Rural District) of the Central District in Pol-e Dokhtar County, Lorestan province, Iran.

== Demographics ==
=== Population ===
At the time of the 2006 National Census, the village's population was 188 in 35 households. The following census in 2011 counted 142 people in 31 households. The 2016 census measured the population of the village as 115 people in 34 households.
