= Owlad, Lorestan =

Owlad (Persian: اولاد) may refer to:

- Posht Tang-e Parian
- Owlad-e Darbandkabud
