= Cham Gerdab, Lorestan =

Village in Lorestan province, Iran

Cham Gerdab Persian: چم گرداب
- Village
- Location within Iran
- Coordinates: 32°56′22″N 47°52′24″E
- Country: Iran
- Province: Lorestan
- County: Pol-e Dokhtar
- District: Bala Geriveh
- Rural District: Jelogir

Population (2016)
  - Total: 192
- Time zone: UTC+3:30 (IRST)

Cham Gerdab (Persian: چم گرداب) (Note: Also romanized as Cham Gerdāb and Cham-e Gerdāb; also known as Chām-e Qerdāb and Cham-ī-Gīrdāb) is a village in Jelogir Rural District of Bala Geriveh District in Pol-e Dokhtar County, Lorestan province, Iran.

== Demographics ==
=== Population ===
At the time of the 2006 National Census, the village's population was 279 in 56 households, when it was in the Central District. The following census in 2011 counted 265 people in 67 households. The 2016 census measured the population of the village as 192 people in 51 households.

In 2023, the rural district was separated from the district in the formation of Bala Geriveh District.
