= Kolivand =

Village in Lorestan province, Iran

Kolivand Persian: كليوند
- Village
- Location within Iran
- Country: Iran
- Province: Lorestan
- County: Pol-e Dokhtar
- District: Central
- Rural District: Malavi

Population (2016)
  - Total: 525
- Time zone: UTC+3:30 (IRST)

Kolivand (Persian: كليوند) (Note: Also romanized as Kolīvand) is a village in Malavi Rural District of the Central District in Pol-e Dokhtar County, Lorestan province, Iran.

== Demographics ==
=== Population ===
At the time of the 2006 National Census, the village's population was 547 in 121 households. The following census in 2011 counted 540 people in 136 households. The 2016 census measured the population of the village as 525 people in 151 households.
