= Cheshmeh Sefid, Tarhan =

Village in Lorestan province, Iran

Cheshmeh Sefid Persian: چشمه سفيد
- Village
- Location within Iran
- Coordinates: 33°33′05″N 47°03′45″E
- Country: Iran
- Province: Lorestan
- County: Kuhdasht
- District: Tarhan
- Rural District: Tarhan-e Gharbi

Population (2016)
  - Total: 761
- Time zone: UTC+3:30 (IRST)

Cheshmeh Sefid (Persian: چشمه سفيد) (Note: Also romanized as Cheshmeh Sefīd) is a village in Tarhan-e Gharbi Rural District of Tarhan District in Kuhdasht County, Lorestan province, Iran.

== Demographics ==
=== Population ===
At the time of the 2006 National Census, the village's population was 1,376 in 252 households. The following census in 2011 counted 1,146 people in 254 households. The 2016 census measured the population of the village as 761 people in 188 households, the most populous in its rural district.
