= Vareh Zard =

Village in Lorestan province, Iran

Vareh Zard Persian: وره زرد
- Village
- Location within Iran
- Coordinates: 33°13′17″N 47°43′31″E
- Country: Iran
- Province: Lorestan
- County: Pol-e Dokhtar
- District: Central
- Rural District: Malavi

Population (2016)
  - Total: 945
- Time zone: UTC+3:30 (IRST)

Vareh Zard (Persian: وره زرد, also known as Vareh Zard-e Khersdar) is a village in Malavi Rural District of the Central District in Pol-e Dokhtar County, Lorestan province, Iran.

== Demographics ==
=== Population ===
At the time of the 2006 National Census, the village's population was 852 in 197 households. The following census in 2011 counted 970 people in 255 households. The 2016 census measured the population of the village as 945 people in 283 households.
