= Kul Badam-e Yavar =

Kul Badam-e Yavar كول بادام ياور
- Village
- Location within Iran
- Coordinates: 33°34′50″N 47°00′20″E
- Country: Iran
- Province: Lorestan
- County: Kuhdasht
- Bakhsh: Tarhan
- Rural District: Tarhan-e Gharbi

Population (2006)
  - Total: 123
- Time zone: UTC+3:30 (IRST)
  - Summer (DST): UTC+4:30 (IRDT)

Kul Badam-e Yavar (Persian: كول بادام ياور, also Romanized as Kūl Bādām-e Yāvar; also known as Kūl Bādām) is a village in Tarhan-e Gharbi Rural District, Tarhan District, Kuhdasht County, Lorestan Province, Iran. At the 2006 census, its population was 123, in 22 families.
