= Do Kuheh-ye Rashnow =

Village in Lorestan province, Iran

Do Kuheh-ye Rashnow Persian: دوكوهه رشنو
- Village
- Location within Iran
- Coordinates: 33°07′45″N 47°39′35″E
- Country: Iran
- Province: Lorestan
- County: Pol-e Dokhtar
- District: Central
- Rural District: Jayedar-e Shomali

Population (2016)
  - Total: 188
- Time zone: UTC+3:30 (IRST)

Do Kuheh-ye Rashnow (Persian: دوكوهه رشنو) (Note: Also romanized as Do Kūheh-ye Rashnow; also known as Do Kūheh) is a village in Jayedar-e Shomali Rural District (Note: Formerly Jayedar Rural District) of the Central District in Pol-e Dokhtar County, Lorestan province, Iran.

== Demographics ==
=== Population ===
At the time of the 2006 National Census, the village's population was 225 in 47 households. The following census in 2011 counted 205 people in 57 households. The 2016 census measured the population of the village as 188 people in 52 households.
