= Sar Qabrestan-e Olya Shamal =

Village in Lorestan, Iran

Sar Qabrestan-e Olya Shamal سر قبرستان عليا شمال
- Village
- Location within Iran
- Coordinates: 33°10′00″N 47°57′00″E
- Country: Iran
- Province: Lorestan
- County: Pol-e Dokhtar
- Bakhsh: Central
- Rural District: Miyankuh-e Gharbi

Population (2006)
  - Total: 14
- Time zone: UTC+3:30 (IRST)
  - Summer (DST): UTC+4:30 (IRDT)

Sar Qabrestan-e Olya Shamal (Persian: سر قبرستان عليا شمال, also Romanized as Sar Qabrestān-e ‘Olyā Shamāl; also known as Sar Qabrestān-e ‘Olyā) is a village in Miyankuh-e Gharbi Rural District, in the Central District of Pol-e Dokhtar County, Lorestan Province, Iran. At the 2006 census, its population was 14, in 4 families.
