= Ab Zahreh Pirmar =

Village in Lorestan province, Iran

Ab Zahreh Pirmar Persian: اب زهره پيرمار
- Village
- Country: Iran
- Province: Lorestan
- County: Pol-e Dokhtar
- District: Central
- Rural District: Miyankuh-e Gharbi

Population (2016)
  - Total: 63
- Time zone: UTC+3:30 (IRST)

Ab Zahreh Pirmar (Persian: اب زهره پيرمار) (Note: Also romanized as Āb Zahreh Pīrmār) is a village in Miyankuh-e Gharbi Rural District of the Central District in Pol-e Dokhtar County, Lorestan province, Iran.

== Demographics ==
=== Population ===
At the time of the 2006 National Census, the village's population was 83 in 14 households. The following census in 2011 counted 41 people in 10 households. The 2016 census measured the population of the village as 63 people in 16 households.
