= Mida =

Mida may refer to:

- Mida, Lorestan, a village in Iran
- Mida (singer) (born 1999), an Italian-Venezuelan singer-songwriter
- Mida (website), Israeli online magazine
- Lucia Mida, a golfer
- MIDA, an organic compound
- Mida Rana, a character from Yandere Simulator
- Mida (plant), a genus of Santalaceae
- Malaysian Investment Development Authority, the Malaysian governmental agency for manufacturing investment
