= Kalak Bisheh-ye Qahramani =

Kalak Bisheh-ye Qahramani کلک بيشه قهرماني
- Village
- Location within Iran
- Coordinates: 33°12′00″N 47°51′00″E
- Country: Iran
- Province: Lorestan
- County: Pol-e Dokhtar
- Bakhsh: Central
- Rural District: Malavi

Population (2006)
  - Total: 33
- Time zone: UTC+3:30 (IRST)
  - Summer (DST): UTC+4:30 (IRDT)

Kalak Bisheh-ye Qahramani (Persian: کلک بيشه قهرماني, also Romanized as Kalak Bīsheh-ye Qahramānī) is a village in Malavi Rural District, in the Central District of Pol-e Dokhtar County, Lorestan Province, Iran. At the 2006 census, its population was 33, in 8 families.
