= Raisvand =

Village in Lorestan province, Iran

Raisvand Persian: رئيس وند
- Village
- Location within Iran
- Coordinates: 33°30′01″N 47°12′40″E
- Country: Iran
- Province: Lorestan
- County: Kuhdasht
- District: Tarhan
- Rural District: Tarhan-e Sharqi

Population (2016)
  - Total: 398
- Time zone: UTC+3:30 (IRST)

Raisvand (Persian: رئيس وند) (Note: Also romanized as Ra'īsvand) is a village in Tarhan-e Sharqi Rural District (Note: Formerly Tarhan Rural District) of Tarhan District in Kuhdasht County, Lorestan province, Iran.

== Demographics ==
=== Population ===
At the time of the 2006 National Census, the village's population was 548 in 104 households. The following census in 2011 counted 588 people in 138 households. The 2016 census measured the population of the village as 398 people in 104 households.
