= Chah-e Kheyreh =

Village in Lorestan province, Iran

Chah-e Kheyreh Persian: چاه خيره
- Village
- Location within Iran
- Coordinates: 33°32′40″N 47°04′16″E
- Country: Iran
- Province: Lorestan
- County: Kuhdasht
- District: Tarhan
- Rural District: Tarhan-e Gharbi

Population (2016)
  - Total: 388
- Time zone: UTC+3:30 (IRST)

Chah-e Kheyreh (Persian: چاه خيره) (Note: Also romanized as Chāh-e Kheyreh; also known as Chah Kheyr, Chāh Kheyr, and Cheshmeh Khomeynī (چشمه خميني)) is a village in Tarhan-e Gharbi Rural District of Tarhan District in Kuhdasht County, Lorestan province, Iran.

== Demographics ==
=== Population ===
At the time of the 2006 National Census, the village's population was 544 in 99 households. The following census in 2011 counted 537 people in 124 households. The 2016 census measured the population of the village as 388 people in 99 households.
