= Jolgeh-ye Khalaj-e Sofla =

Jolgeh-ye Khalaj-e Sofla جلگه خلج سفلي
- Village
- Location within Iran
- Coordinates: 33°16′52″N 47°49′23″E
- Country: Iran
- Province: Lorestan
- County: Pol-e Dokhtar
- Bakhsh: Central
- Rural District: Malavi

Population (2006)
  - Total: 284
- Time zone: UTC+3:30 (IRST)
  - Summer (DST): UTC+4:30 (IRDT)

Jolgeh-ye Khalaj-e Sofla (Persian: جلگه خلج سفلي, also Romanized as Jolgeh-ye Khalaj-e Soflá; also known as Jolgeh-ye Khalaj, Julgai, Jolgeh Khalaj, and Jolgeh-ye Khalaj-e Pā’īn) is a village in Malavi Rural District, in the Central District of Pol-e Dokhtar County, Lorestan Province, Iran. At the 2006 census, its population was 284, in 67 families.
