= Sar Qabrestan-e Sofla Shamal =

Sar Qabrestan-e Sofla Shamal سر قبرستان سفلي شمال
- Village
- Location within Iran
- Coordinates: 33°09′24″N 47°56′57″E
- Country: Iran
- Province: Lorestan
- County: Pol-e Dokhtar
- Bakhsh: Central
- Rural District: Miyankuh-e Gharbi

Population (2006)
  - Total: 38
- Time zone: UTC+3:30 (IRST)
  - Summer (DST): UTC+4:30 (IRDT)

Sar Qabrestan-e Sofla Shamal (Persian: سر قبرستان سفلي شمال, also Romanized as Sar Qabrestān-e Soflá Shamāl) is a village in Miyankuh-e Gharbi Rural District, in the Central District of Pol-e Dokhtar County, Lorestan Province, Iran. At the 2006 census, its population was 38, in 7 families.
