= Mohammad Zaki Kushki =

Mohammad Zaki Kushki محمدزکي کوشکي
- Village
- Location within Iran
- Coordinates: 33°28′54″N 47°09′59″E
- Country: Iran
- Province: Lorestan
- County: Kuhdasht
- Bakhsh: Tarhan
- Rural District: Tarhan-e Gharbi

Population (2006)
  - Total: 175
- Time zone: UTC+3:30 (IRST)
  - Summer (DST): UTC+4:30 (IRDT)

Mohammad Zaki Kushki (Persian: محمدزکي کوشکي, also Romanized as Moḥammad Zakī Kūshkī; also known as Chāh Shūreh-ye Soflá) is a village in Tarhan-e Gharbi Rural District, Tarhan District, Kuhdasht County, Lorestan Province, Iran. At the 2006 census, its population was 175, in 32 families.
