= Murani =

Murani may refer to:

- a village in Pișchia, Romania
- Murani, Iran, a village in Lorestan Province, Iran
- Murani, Isfahan, a village in Isfahan Province, Iran
