= Bagh-e Bala, Pol-e Dokhtar =

Village in Lorestan province, Iran

Bagh-e Bala Persian: باغ بالا
- Village
- Location within Iran
- Coordinates: 33°07′32″N 47°38′12″E
- Country: Iran
- Province: Lorestan
- County: Pol-e Dokhtar
- District: Central
- Rural District: Jayedar-e Shomali

Population (2016)
  - Total: 78
- Time zone: UTC+3:30 (IRST)

Bagh-e Bala (Persian: باغ بالا) (Note: Also romanized as Bāgh-e Bālā; formerly known as Bagh-e Olya (باغ عليا), also romanized as Bāgh-e ‘Olyā; also known as Bāgh-e Jāydar-e ‘Olyā) is a village in Jayedar-e Shomali Rural District (Note: Formerly Jayedar Rural District) of the Central District in Pol-e Dokhtar County, Lorestan province, Iran.

== Demographics ==
=== Population ===
At the time of the 2006 National Census, the village's population, as Bagh-e Olya, was 189 in 41 households. The following census in 2011 counted 107 people in 27 households, by which time the village was listed as Bagh-e Bala. The 2016 census measured the population of the village as 78 people in 21 households.
