= Sarab-e Jahangir =

Village in Lorestan province, Iran

Sarab-e Jahangir Persian: سرابجهانگير
- Village
- Location within Iran
- Coordinates: 33°07′05″N 47°43′28″E
- Country: Iran
- Province: Lorestan
- County: Pol-e Dokhtar
- District: Central
- Rural District: Jayedar-e Shomali

Population (2016)
  - Total: 0
- Time zone: UTC+3:30 (IRST)

Sarab-e Jahangir (Persian: سرابجهانگير) (Note: Also romanized as Sarāb-e Jahāngīr) is a village in Jayedar-e Shomali Rural District (Note: Formerly Jayedar Rural District) of the Central District in Pol-e Dokhtar County, Lorestan province, Iran.

== Demographics ==
=== Population ===
At the time of the 2006 National Census, the village's population was 11 in four households. The 2016 census measured the population of the village as zero.
