= Kalak Bisheh-ye Sadiq =

Kalak Bisheh-ye Sadiq كلكبيشه صادق
- Village
- Country: Iran
- Province: Lorestan
- County: Pol-e Dokhtar
- Bakhsh: Central
- Rural District: Malavi

Population (2006)
  - Total: 64
- Time zone: UTC+3:30 (IRST)
  - Summer (DST): UTC+4:30 (IRDT)

Kalak Bisheh-ye Sadiq (Persian: كلكبيشه صادق, also Romanized as Kalaḵ Bīsheh-ye Sādiq) is a village in Malavi Rural District, in the Central District of Pol-e Dokhtar County, Lorestan Province, Iran. At the 2006 census, its population was 64, in 14 families.
