= Dom Rustan =

Village in Lorestan province, Iran

Dom Rustan Persian: دم روستان
- Village
- Location within Iran
- Coordinates: 33°28′25″N 47°13′21″E
- Country: Iran
- Province: Lorestan
- County: Kuhdasht
- District: Tarhan
- Rural District: Tarhan-e Sharqi

Population (2016)
  - Total: 1,113
- Time zone: UTC+3:30 (IRST)

Dom Rustan (Persian: دم روستان) (Note: Also romanized as Dom Rūstān; also known as Dom Rāstān and Dūm-ī-Rausān) is a village in Tarhan-e Sharqi Rural District (Note: Formerly Tarhan Rural District) of Tarhan District in Kuhdasht County, Lorestan province, Iran.

== Demographics ==
=== Population ===
At the time of the 2006 National Census, the village's population was 1,568 in 309 households. The following census in 2011 counted 1,492 people in 345 households. The 2016 census measured the population of the village as 1,113 people in 288 households, the most populous in its rural district.
