= Qaleh-ye Mishvand =

Village in Lorestan province, Iran

Qaleh-ye Mishvand Persian: قلعه ميشوند
- Village
- Location within Iran
- Coordinates: 33°04′04″N 48°01′30″E
- Country: Iran
- Province: Lorestan
- County: Pol-e Dokhtar
- District: Central
- Rural District: Miyankuh-e Gharbi

Population (2016)
  - Total: 125
- Time zone: UTC+3:30 (IRST)

Qaleh-ye Mishvand (Persian: قلعه ميشوند) (Note: Also romanized as Qal‘eh Mīshwand and Qal‘eh-ye Mīshvand; also known as Mīshvand) is a village in Miyankuh-e Gharbi Rural District of the Central District in Pol-e Dokhtar County, Lorestan province, Iran.

== Demographics ==
=== Population ===
At the time of the 2006 National Census, the village's population was 216 in 40 households. The following census in 2011 counted 206 people in 27 households. The 2016 census measured the population of the village as 125 people in 28 households.
