= Posht Tang-e Vosta =

Posht Tang-e Vosta (Persian: پشت تنگ وسطی) may refer to:

- Bapir Vali Allah
- Morad Khan
