= Makineh Nasiri =

Village in Lorestan province, Iran

Makineh Nasiri Persian: مكينه نصيري
- Village
- Location within Iran
- Coordinates: 33°06′43″N 47°51′30″E
- Country: Iran
- Province: Lorestan
- County: Pol-e Dokhtar
- District: Central
- Rural District: Miyankuh-e Gharbi

Population (2016)
  - Total: 101
- Time zone: UTC+3:30 (IRST)

Makineh Nasiri (Persian: مكينه نصيري) (Note: Also romanized as Maḵīneh Naṣīrī) is a village in Miyankuh-e Gharbi Rural District of the Central District in Pol-e Dokhtar County, Lorestan province, Iran.

== Demographics ==
=== Population ===
At the time of the 2006 National Census, the village's population was 107 in 26 households. The following census in 2011 counted 87 people in 23 households. The 2016 census measured the population of the village as 101 people in 29 households.
