= Halush =

Village in Lorestan province, Iran

Halush Persian: هلوش
- Village
- Location within Iran
- Coordinates: 33°05′03″N 47°34′02″E
- Country: Iran
- Province: Lorestan
- County: Pol-e Dokhtar
- District: Central
- Rural District: Jayedar-e Shomali

Population (2016)
  - Total: 880
- Time zone: UTC+3:30 (IRST)

Halush (Persian: هلوش) (Note: Also romanized as Halūsh) is a village in Jayedar-e Shomali Rural District (Note: Formerly Jayedar Rural District) of the Central District in Pol-e Dokhtar County, Lorestan province, Iran.

== Demographics ==
=== Population ===
At the time of the 2006 National Census, the village's population was 1,117 in 218 households. The following census in 2011 counted 980 people in 241 households. The 2016 census measured the population of the village as 880 people in 264 households.
