= Garab Kuchek =

Village in Lorestan province, Iran

Garab Kuchek Persian: گراب كوچك
- Village
- Location within Iran
- Coordinates: 33°28′30″N 47°15′05″E
- Country: Iran
- Province: Lorestan
- County: Kuhdasht
- District: Tarhan
- Rural District: Tarhan-e Sharqi

Population (2016)
  - Total: 453
- Time zone: UTC+3:30 (IRST)

Garab Kuchek (Persian: گراب كوچك) (Note: Also romanized as Garāb Kūcheḵ; also known as Garāb and Garāb-e ‘Olyā) is a village in Tarhan-e Sharqi Rural District (Note: Formerly Tarhan Rural District) of Tarhan District in Kuhdasht County, Lorestan province, Iran.

== Demographics ==
=== Population ===
At the time of the 2006 National Census, the village's population was 606 in 119 households. The following census in 2011 counted 590 people in 139 households. The 2016 census measured the population of the village as 453 people in 126 households.
