= Seyyed Hoseyn Kushki =

Seyyed Hoseyn Kushki صيدحسين کوشکي
- Village
- Location within Iran
- Coordinates: 33°29′05″N 47°08′49″E
- Country: Iran
- Province: Lorestan
- County: Kuhdasht
- Bakhsh: Tarhan
- Rural District: Tarhan-e Gharbi

Population (2006)
  - Total: 307
- Time zone: UTC+3:30 (IRST)
  - Summer (DST): UTC+4:30 (IRDT)

Seyyed Hoseyn Kushki (Persian: صيدحسين کوشکي, also Romanized as Seyyed Ḩoseyn Kūshkī; also known as Chāh Shūreh-ye ‘Olyā and Chah Shureh-ye Mohammad Hoseyn) is a village in Tarhan-e Gharbi Rural District, Tarhan District, Kuhdasht County, Lorestan Province, Iran. At the 2006 census, its population was 307, in 56 families.
