= Mohammad Ali Kushki =

Mohammad Ali Kushki محمدعلي کوشکي
- Village
- Location within Iran
- Coordinates: 33°29′00″N 47°09′17″E
- Country: Iran
- Province: Lorestan
- County: Kuhdasht
- Bakhsh: Tarhan
- Rural District: Tarhan-e Gharbi

Population (2006)
  - Total: 222
- Time zone: UTC+3:30 (IRST)
  - Summer (DST): UTC+4:30 (IRDT)

Mohammad Ali Kushki (Persian: محمدعلي کوشکي, also Romanized as Moḥammd ʿAlī Kūshkī; also known as Chāh Shūreh-ye Vosţá) is a village in Tarhan-e Gharbi Rural District, Tarhan District, Kuhdasht County, Lorestan Province, Iran. At the 2006 census, its population was 222, in 39 families.
