= Cham Gerdab =

Cham Gerdab (Persian: چم گرداب) may refer to:

- Cham Gerdab, Ilam
- Cham Gerdab, Lorestan
