= Kalak Bisheh-ye Asad =

Kalak Bisheh-ye Asad كلك بيشه اسد
- Village
- Country: Iran
- Province: Lorestan
- County: Pol-e Dokhtar
- Bakhsh: Central
- Rural District: Malavi

Population (2006)
  - Total: 58
- Time zone: UTC+3:30 (IRST)
  - Summer (DST): UTC+4:30 (IRDT)

Kalak Bisheh-ye Asad (Persian: كلك بيشه اسد, also Romanized as Kalaḵ Bīsheh-ye Āsad) is a village in Malavi Rural District, in the Central District of Pol-e Dokhtar County, Lorestan Province, Iran. At the 2006 census, its population was 58, in 12 families.
