= Vashian-e Cheshmeh Shirin =

Village in Lorestan province, Iran

Vashian-e Cheshmeh Shirin Persian: واشيان چشمه شيرين
- Village
- Location within Iran
- Coordinates: 33°11′39″N 47°46′24″E
- Country: Iran
- Province: Lorestan
- County: Pol-e Dokhtar
- District: Central
- Rural District: Miyankuh-e Gharbi

Population (2016)
  - Total: 309
- Time zone: UTC+3:30 (IRST)

Vashian-e Cheshmeh Shirin (Persian: واشيان چشمه شيرين) (Note: Also romanized as Vāshīān-e Cheshmeh Shīrīn; also known as Cheshmeh Shīrīn-e Vāshīān) is a village in Miyankuh-e Gharbi Rural District of the Central District in Pol-e Dokhtar County, Lorestan province, Iran.

== Demographics ==
=== Population ===
At the time of the 2006 National Census, the village's population was 341 in 71 households. The following census in 2011 counted 319 people in 80 households. The 2016 census measured the population of the village as 309 people in 86 households.
