= Morad Khan =

Village in Lorestan province, Iran

Morad Khan Persian: مراد خان
- Village
- Location within Iran
- Country: Iran
- Province: Lorestan
- County: Kuhdasht
- District: Tarhan
- Rural District: Tarhan-e Sharqi

Population (2016)
  - Total: 240
- Time zone: UTC+3:30 (IRST)

Morad Khan (Persian: مراد خان) (Note: Also romanized as Morād Khān; also known as Posht Tang-e Vosţá (پشت تنگ وسطي)) is a village in Tarhan-e Sharqi Rural District (Note: Formerly Tarhan Rural District) of Tarhan District in Kuhdasht County, Lorestan province, Iran.

== Demographics ==
=== Population ===
At the time of the 2006 National Census, the village's population was 427 in 82 households. The following census in 2011 counted 320 people in 84 households. The 2016 census measured the population of the village as 240 people in 76 households.
