= Khersdar-e Sofla =

Village in Lorestan province, Iran

Khersdar-e Sofla Persian: خرسدرسفلي
- Village
- Location within Iran
- Coordinates: 33°12′22″N 47°43′11″E
- Country: Iran
- Province: Lorestan
- County: Pol-e Dokhtar
- District: Central
- Rural District: Malavi

Population (2016)
  - Total: 554
- Time zone: UTC+3:30 (IRST)

Khersdar-e Sofla (Persian: خرسدرسفلي) (Note: Also romanized as Khersdar-e Soflá) is a village in Malavi Rural District of the Central District in Pol-e Dokhtar County, Lorestan province, Iran.

== Demographics ==
=== Population ===
At the time of the 2006 National Census, the village's population was 600 in 134 households. The following census in 2011 counted 576 people in 153 households. The 2016 census measured the population of the village as 554 people in 161 households.
