= Baba Khvarazm-e Karim =

Village in Lorestan province, Iran

Baba Khvarazm-e Karim Persian: باباخوارزم کريم
- Village
- Location within Iran
- Coordinates: 33°06′06″N 47°33′10″E
- Country: Iran
- Province: Lorestan
- County: Pol-e Dokhtar
- District: Central
- Rural District: Jayedar-e Shomali

Population (2016)
  - Total: 148
- Time zone: UTC+3:30 (IRST)

Baba Khvarazm-e Karim (Persian: باباخوارزم کريم) (Note: Also romanized as Bābā Khvārazm-e Karīm; also known as Bābā Khvārazm and Bābā Khvārazm-e Soflá (باباخوارزم سفلي)) is a village in Jayedar-e Shomali Rural District (Note: Formerly Jayedar Rural District) of the Central District in Pol-e Dokhtar County, Lorestan province, Iran.

== Demographics ==
=== Population ===
At the time of the 2006 National Census, the village's population was 193 in 41 households. The following census in 2011 counted 197 people in 44 households. The 2016 census measured the population of the village as 148 people in 46 households.
