= Cham Gerdeleh-ye Vosta =

Village in Lorestan province, Iran

Cham Gerdeleh-ye Vosta Persian: چمگردله وسطي
- Village
- Location within Iran
- Coordinates: 33°09′58″N 47°40′31″E
- Country: Iran
- Province: Lorestan
- County: Pol-e Dokhtar
- District: Central
- Rural District: Jayedar-e Shomali

Population (2016)
  - Total: 85
- Time zone: UTC+3:30 (IRST)

Cham Gerdeleh-ye Vosta (Persian: چمگردله وسطي) (Note: Also romanized as Cham Gerdeleh-ye Vosţá; also known as Cham Gerdeleh, Cham Geredeleh, Cham Geredeleh-ye Vosta, and Cham Geredeleh-ye Vosţá) is a village in Jayedar-e Shomali Rural District (Note: Formerly Jayedar Rural District) of the Central District in Pol-e Dokhtar County, Lorestan province, Iran.

== Demographics ==
=== Population ===
At the time of the 2006 National Census, the village's population was 43 in eight households. The following census in 2011 counted 46 people in 11 households. The 2016 census measured the population of the village as 85 people in 27 households.
