= Zuleh, Lorestan =

Village in Lorestan province, Iran

Zuleh Persian: زوله
- Village
- Location within Iran
- Coordinates: 33°33′35″N 47°04′32″E
- Country: Iran
- Province: Lorestan
- County: Kuhdasht
- District: Tarhan
- Rural District: Tarhan-e Gharbi

Population (2016)
  - Total: 174
- Time zone: UTC+3:30 (IRST)

Zuleh (Persian: زوله) (Note: Also romanized as Zūleh) is a village in Tarhan-e Gharbi Rural District of Tarhan District in Kuhdasht County, Lorestan province, Iran.

== Demographics ==
=== Population ===
At the time of the 2006 National Census, the village's population was 287 in 52 households. The following census in 2011 counted 263 people in 55 households. The 2016 census measured the population of the village as 174 people in 43 households.
