= Baba Khvarazm-e Bala =

Village in Lorestan province, Iran

Baba Khvarazm-e Bala Persian: باباخوارزم بالا
- Village
- Location within Iran
- Country: Iran
- Province: Lorestan
- County: Pol-e Dokhtar
- District: Central
- Rural District: Jayedar-e Shomali

Population (2016)
  - Total: 0
- Time zone: UTC+3:30 (IRST)

Baba Khvarazm-e Bala (Persian: باباخوارزم بالا) (Note: Also romanized as Bābā Khvārazm-e Bālā; formerly known as Baba Khvarazm-e Olya (باباخوارزم عليا), also romanized as Bābā Khvārazm-e ‘Olyā) is a village in Jayedar-e Shomali Rural District (Note: Formerly Jayedar Rural District) of the Central District in Pol-e Dokhtar County, Lorestan province, Iran.

== Demographics ==
=== Population ===
At the time of the 2006 National Census, the village's population, as Baba Khvarazm-e Olya, was 18 in five households. The 2016 census measured the population of the village as zero, by which time the village was listed as Baba Khvarazm-e Bala.
