= Sarab Hammam =

City in Lorestan province, Iran

Sarab Hammam Persian: سراب حمام
- City
- Location within Iran
- Coordinates: 33°06′54″N 47°41′35″E
- Country: Iran
- Province: Lorestan
- County: Pol-e Dokhtar
- District: Central
- Established as a city: 2020

Population (2016)
  - Total: 4,054
- Time zone: UTC+3:30 (IRST)

Sarab Hammam (Persian: سراب حمام) (Note: Also romanized as Sarāb Ḩammām and Sarāb-e-Hammān; also known as Sarab Hamman, Sarab Hammān, Sarāb-e Ḩammām-e Darvīshhā, Sarāi Hamām, Sarāy Ḩammām, and Sheykh Ḩoseynābād) is a city in the Central District of Pol-e Dokhtar County, Lorestan province, Iran. As a village, it was the capital of Jayedar Rural District. (Note: Renamed Jayedar-e Shomali Rural District) Its capital was transferred to the village of Valieasr, and again in 2023 to the village of Rahimabad.

== Demographics ==
=== Population ===
At the time of the 2006 National Census, Sarab Hammam's population was 1,108 in 227 households, when it was a village in Jayedar Rural District. The following census in 2011 counted 3,868 people in 1,009 households, by which time the village had merged with the villages of Sarab-e Ganj Ali and Sarab Mahmudvand. The 2016 census measured the population of the village as 4,054 people in 1,161 households, the most populous in its rural district.

Sarab Hammam was converted to a city in 2023.
