= Cham Gerdeleh-ye Olya =

Village in Lorestan province, Iran

Cham Gerdeleh-ye Olya Persian: چمگردله عليا
- Village
- Location within Iran
- Coordinates: 33°09′54″N 47°41′14″E
- Country: Iran
- Province: Lorestan
- County: Pol-e Dokhtar
- District: Central
- Rural District: Jayedar-e Shomali

Population (2016)
  - Total: 161
- Time zone: UTC+3:30 (IRST)

Cham Gerdeleh-ye Olya (Persian: چمگردله عليا) (Note: Also romanized as Cham Gerdeleh-ye ‘Olyā; also known as Cham Gerdeleh) is a village in Jayedar-e Shomali Rural District (Note: Formerly Jayedar Rural District) of the Central District in Pol-e Dokhtar County, Lorestan province, Iran.

== Demographics ==
=== Population ===
At the time of the 2006 National Census, the village's population was 107 in 21 households. The following census in 2011 counted 159 people in 41 households. The 2016 census measured the population of the village as 161 people in 45 households.
