= Choghapit-e Bala =

Village in Lorestan province, Iran

Choghapit-e Bala Persian: چغاپيت بالا
- Village
- Location within Iran
- Coordinates: 33°30′48″N 47°05′50″E
- Country: Iran
- Province: Lorestan
- County: Kuhdasht
- District: Tarhan
- Rural District: Tarhan-e Gharbi

Population (2016)
  - Total: 607
- Time zone: UTC+3:30 (IRST)

Choghapit-e Bala (Persian: چغاپيت بالا) (Note: Also romanized as Choghāpīt-e Bālā; formerly known as Chapit-e Olya (چاپيت عليا), also romanized as Chāp‘īt-e 'Olyā; also known as Chagha Beit Olya, Chāh-e Pait, Chāh-i-Pait, Choghā Peyat-e 'Olyā, Choqā Peyat, and Choqā Peyat-e 'Olyā (چقاپيت عليا)) is a village in Tarhan-e Gharbi Rural District of Tarhan District in Kuhdasht County, Lorestan province, Iran.

== Demographics ==
=== Population ===
At the time of the 2006 National Census, the village's population, as Chapit-e Olya, was 867 in 164 households. The following census in 2011 counted 829 people in 174 households, by which time the village was listed as Choghapit-e Bala. The 2016 census measured the population of the village as 607 people in 159 households.
