= Kol-e Sorkh Eidi =

Village in Lorestan province, Iran

Kol-e Sorkh Eidi Persian: كل سرخ عيدي
- Village
- Location within Iran
- Coordinates: 33°27′37″N 47°18′44″E
- Country: Iran
- Province: Lorestan
- County: Kuhdasht
- District: Tarhan
- Rural District: Tarhan-e Sharqi

Population (2016)
  - Total: 222
- Time zone: UTC+3:30 (IRST)

Kol-e Sorkh Eidi (Persian: كل سرخ عيدي) (Note: Also romanized as Kol-e Sorkh Eīdī; also known as Gol-e Sorkh, Kol-e Sorkh Yeydi, and Kol-e Sorkh Yeydī) is a village in Tarhan-e Sharqi Rural District (Note: Formerly Tarhan Rural District) of Tarhan District in Kuhdasht County, Lorestan province, Iran.

== Demographics ==
=== Population ===
At the time of the 2006 National Census, the village's population was 352 in 70 households. The following census in 2011 counted 379 people in 83 households. The 2016 census measured the population of the village as 222 people in 64 households.
