= Garab, Lorestan =

City in Lorestan province, Iran

Garab garaw Persian: گراب
- City
- Location within Iran
- Coordinates: 33°28′26″N 47°14′07″E
- Country: Iran
- Province: Lorestan
- County: Kuhdasht
- District: Tarhan
- Established as a city: 1996

Population (2016)
  - Total: 3,295
- Time zone: UTC+3:30 (IRST)

Garab (Persian: گراب) (Note: Also romanized as Garāb; also known as Garāb-e ‘Olyā) is a city in, and the capital of, Tarhan District in Kuhdasht County, Lorestan province, Iran. It also serves as the administrative center for Tarhan-e Sharqi Rural District. (Note: Formerly Tarhan Rural District) The village of Garab was converted to a city in 1996.

== Demographics ==
=== Population ===
At the time of the 2006 National Census, the city's population was 3,270 in 687 households. The following census in 2011 counted 3,200 people in 822 households. The 2016 census measured the population of the city as 3,295 people in 966 households.
