= Vashian-e Nasir Tappeh =

Village in Lorestan province, Iran

Vashian-e Nasir Tappeh Persian: واشيان نصيرتپه
- Village
- Location within Iran
- Coordinates: 33°11′15″N 47°48′00″E
- Country: Iran
- Province: Lorestan
- County: Pol-e Dokhtar
- District: Central
- Rural District: Miyankuh-e Gharbi

Population (2016)
  - Total: 409
- Time zone: UTC+3:30 (IRST)

Vashian-e Nasir Tappeh (Persian: واشيان نصيرتپه) (Note: Also romanized as Vāshīān-e Naşīr Tappeh; also known as Tappeh Vāshīān, Vāsheyān, Vāshyān, and Wāshiyan) is a village in, and the capital of, Miyankuh-e Gharbi Rural District in the Central District of Pol-e Dokhtar County, Lorestan province, Iran.

== Demographics ==
=== Population ===
At the time of the 2006 National Census, the village's population was 378 in 83 households. The following census in 2011 counted 336 people in 90 households. The 2016 census measured the population of the village as 409 people in 117 households. It was the most populous village in its rural district.
