= Cham Mehr-e Pain =

Village in Lorestan province, Iran

Cham Mehr-e Pain Persian: چممهرپايين
- Village
- Location within Iran
- Coordinates: 33°07′00″N 47°32′58″E
- Country: Iran
- Province: Lorestan
- County: Pol-e Dokhtar
- District: Central
- Rural District: Jayedar-e Shomali

Population (2016)
  - Total: 614
- Time zone: UTC+3:30 (IRST)

Cham Mehr-e Pain (Persian: چممهرپايين) (Note: Also romanized as Cham Mehr-e Pā‘īn; also known as Cham-e Mehr) is a village in Jayedar-e Shomali Rural District (Note: Formerly Jayedar Rural District) of the Central District in Pol-e Dokhtar County, Lorestan province, Iran.

== Demographics ==
=== Population ===
At the time of the 2006 National Census, the village's population was 719 in 147 households. The following census in 2011 counted 704 people in 165 households. The 2016 census measured the population of the village as 614 people in 183 households.
