= Jolgeh-ye Khalaj-e Olya =

Village in Lorestan province, Iran

Jolgeh-ye Khalaj-e Olya Persian: جلگه خلج عليا
- Village
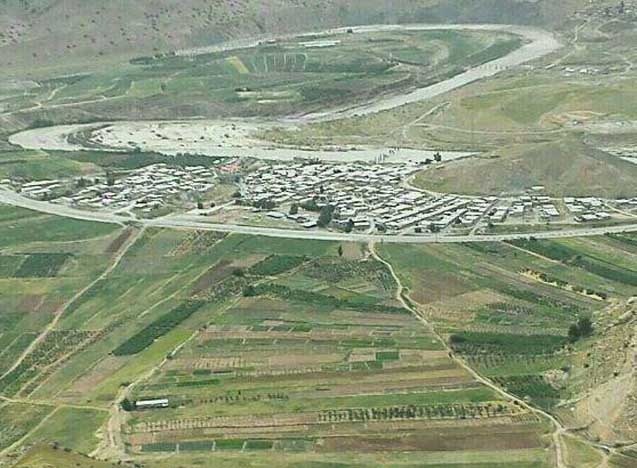
- The village of Jolgeh-ye Khalaj-e Olya

- Location within Iran
- Coordinates: 33°16′54″N 47°49′22″E
- Country: Iran
- Province: Lorestan
- County: Pol-e Dokhtar
- District: Central
- Rural District: Malavi

Population (2016)
  - Total: 684
- Time zone: UTC+3:30 (IRST)

Jolgeh-ye Khalaj-e Olya (Persian: جلگه خلج عليا) (Note: Also romanized as Jolgeh-ye Khalaj-e 'Olyā; also known as Jolgeh Khalaj, Jolgeh-ye Khalaj, and Jolgeh-ye Khalaj-e Bālā) is a village in Malavi Rural District of the Central District in Pol-e Dokhtar County, Lorestan province, Iran.

== Demographics ==
=== Population ===
At the time of the 2006 National Census, the village's population was 761 in 182 households. The following census in 2011 counted 739 people in 202 households. The 2016 census measured the population of the village as 684 people in 222 households.
