= Mireh va Ahmad =

Village in Lorestan province, Iran

Mireh va Ahmad Persian: ميره و احمد
- Village
- Location within Iran
- Country: Iran
- Province: Lorestan
- County: Kuhdasht
- District: Tarhan
- Rural District: Tarhan-e Sharqi

Population (2016)
  - Total: 257
- Time zone: UTC+3:30 (IRST)

Mireh va Ahmad (Persian: ميره و احمد) (Note: Also romanized as Mīreh va Āḥmad; also known as Posht Tang-e ‘Olyā (پشت تنگ عليا)) is a village in Tarhan-e Sharqi Rural District (Note: Formerly Tarhan Rural District) of Tarhan District in Kuhdasht County, Lorestan province, Iran.

== Demographics ==
=== Population ===
At the time of the 2006 National Census, the village's population was 375 in 71 households. The following census in 2011 counted 305 people in 78 households. The 2016 census measured the population of the village as 257 people in 75 households.
