= Vashian-e Takht Shir =

Village in Lorestan province, Iran

Vashian-e Takht Shir Persian: واشيان تخت شير
- Village
- Location within Iran
- Coordinates: 33°11′36″N 47°45′15″E
- Country: Iran
- Province: Lorestan
- County: Pol-e Dokhtar
- District: Central
- Rural District: Miyankuh-e Gharbi

Population (2016)
  - Total: 113
- Time zone: UTC+3:30 (IRST)

Vashian-e Takht Shir (Persian: واشيان تخت شير) (Note: Also romanized as Vāshīān-e Takht Shīr; also known as Takht Shīr-e Vāshīān and Vāshīān) is a village in Miyankuh-e Gharbi Rural District of the Central District in Pol-e Dokhtar County, Lorestan province, Iran.

== Demographics ==
=== Population ===
At the time of the 2006 National Census, the village's population was 143 in 27 households. The following census in 2011 counted 133 people in 29 households. The 2016 census measured the population of the village as 113 people in 30 households.
