= Choghapit =

Village in Lorestan province, Iran

Choghapit Persian: چغاپيت
- Village
- Location within Iran
- Coordinates: 33°30′33″N 47°06′10″E
- Country: Iran
- Province: Lorestan
- County: Kuhdasht
- District: Tarhan
- Rural District: Tarhan-e Gharbi

Population (2016)
  - Total: 713
- Time zone: UTC+3:30 (IRST)

Choghapit (Persian: چغاپيت) (Note: Also romanized as Choghāpīt; formerly known as Chapit-e Sofla (چاپيت سفلي), also romanized as Chāp‘īt-e Soflá; also known as Chagha Beit Sofla, Choghā Peyat-e Soflá, and Choqā Peyat-e Soflá (چقا پيت سفلي)) is a village in, and the capital of, Tarhan-e Gharbi Rural District in Tarhan District of Kuhdasht County, Lorestan province, Iran.

== Demographics ==
=== Population ===
At the time of the 2006 National Census, the village's population, as Chapit-e Sofla, was 1,104 in 221 households. The following census in 2011 counted 955 people in 218 households, by which time the village was listed as Choghapit. The 2016 census measured the population of the village as 713 people in 203 households.
