= Baba Khvarazm-e Mojir =

Village in Lorestan province, Iran

Baba Khvarazm-e Mojir Persian: باباخوارزم مجير
- Village
- Country: Iran
- Province: Lorestan
- County: Pol-e Dokhtar
- District: Central
- Rural District: Jayedar-e Shomali

Population (2016)
  - Total: 88
- Time zone: UTC+3:30 (IRST)

Baba Khvarazm-e Mojir (Persian: باباخوارزم مجير) (Note: Also romanized as Bābā Khvārazm-e Mojīr) is a village in Jayedar-e Shomali Rural District (Note: Formerly Jayedar Rural District) of the Central District in Pol-e Dokhtar County, Lorestan province, Iran.

== Demographics ==
=== Population ===
At the time of the 2006 National Census, the village's population was 94 in 21 households. The following census in 2011 counted 92 people in 27 households. The 2016 census measured the population of the village as 68 people in 23 households.
