= Murani, Iran =

Village in Lorestan province, Iran

Murani Persian: موراني
- Village
- Location within Iran
- Coordinates: 33°15′12″N 47°44′58″E
- Country: Iran
- Province: Lorestan
- County: Pol-e Dokhtar
- District: Central
- Rural District: Malavi

Population (2016)
  - Total: 1,770
- Time zone: UTC+3:30 (IRST)

Murani (Persian: موراني) (Note: Also romanized as Mūrānī; also known as Mūrūni) is a village in, and the capital of, Malavi Rural District in the Central District of Pol-e Dokhtar County, Lorestan province, Iran.

== Demographics ==
=== Population ===
At the time of the 2006 National Census, the village's population was 1,765 in 411 households. The following census in 2011 counted 1,764 people in 464 households. The 2016 census measured the population of the village as 1,770 people in 546 households, the most populous in its rural district.
