= Cham Gerdeleh-ye Sofla =

Village in Lorestan province, Iran

Cham Gerdeleh-ye Sofla Persian: چمگردله سفلي
- Village
- Location within Iran
- Coordinates: 33°09′59″N 47°40′32″E
- Country: Iran
- Province: Lorestan
- County: Pol-e Dokhtar
- District: Central
- Rural District: Jayedar-e Shomali

Population (2016)
  - Total: 571
- Time zone: UTC+3:30 (IRST)

Cham Gerdeleh-ye Sofla (Persian: چمگردله سفلي) (Note: Also romanized as Cham Gerdeleh-ye Soflá; also known as Cham Gerdeleh) is a village in Jayedar-e Shomali Rural District (Note: Formerly Jayedar Rural District) of the Central District in Pol-e Dokhtar County, Lorestan province, Iran.

== Demographics ==
=== Population ===
At the time of the 2006 National Census, the village's population was 566 in 124 households. The following census in 2011 counted 620 people in 152 households. The 2016 census measured the population of the village as 571 people in 166 households.
