= Valieasr, Lorestan =

Village in Lorestan province, Iran

Valieasr Persian: وليعصر
- Village
- Location within Iran
- Coordinates: 33°05′26″N 47°43′22″E
- Country: Iran
- Province: Lorestan
- County: Pol-e Dokhtar
- District: Bala Geriveh
- Rural District: Jayedar-e Jonubi

Population (2016)
  - Total: 975
- Time zone: UTC+3:30 (IRST)

Valieasr (Persian: وليعصر) (Note: Also romanized as Valīe‘aşr) is a village in Jayedar-e Jonubi Rural District of Bala Geriveh District in Pol-e Dokhtar County, Lorestan province, Iran, serving as capital of the district. It was previously the capital of Jayedar Rural District (Note: Renamed Jayedar-e Shomali Rural District) in the Central District after its original capital, the village of Sarab Hammam, was converted to a city.

== Demographics ==
=== Population ===
At the time of the 2006 National Census, the village's population was 1,065 in 220 households, when it was in Jayedar Rural District of the Central District. The following census in 2011 counted 430 people in 110 households. The 2016 census measured the population of the village as 975 people in 276 households.

In 2023, the rural district was renamed Jayedar-e Shomali Rural District, and the village was separated from it in the formation of Bala Geriveh District. Valieasr was transferred to Jayedar-e Jonubi Rural District created in the new district.
