= Bapir Vali Allah =

Village in Lorestan province, Iran

Bapir Vali Allah Persian: باپير ولي اله
- Village
- Location within Iran
- Coordinates: 33°26′59″N 47°12′54″E
- Country: Iran
- Province: Lorestan
- County: Kuhdasht
- District: Tarhan
- Rural District: Tarhan-e Sharqi

Population (2016)
  - Total: 434
- Time zone: UTC+3:30 (IRST)

Bapir Vali Allah (Persian: باپير ولي اله) (Note: Also romanized as Bāpīr Valī Āllah; also known as Posht Tang-e Vosţá (پشت تنگ وسطي)) is a village in Tarhan-e Sharqi Rural District (Note: Formerly Tarhan Rural District) of Tarhan District in Kuhdasht County, Lorestan province, Iran.

== Demographics ==
=== Population ===
At the time of the 2006 National Census, the village's population was 566 in 112 households. The following census in 2011 counted 489 people in 115 households. The 2016 census measured the population of the village as 434 people in 123 households.
