= Cham Mehr-e Bala =

Village in Lorestan province, Iran

Cham Mehr-e Bala Persian: چممهربالا
- Village
- Location within Iran
- Coordinates: 33°07′14″N 47°33′15″E
- Country: Iran
- Province: Lorestan
- County: Pol-e Dokhtar
- District: Central
- Rural District: Jayedar-e Shomali

Population (2016)
  - Total: 540
- Time zone: UTC+3:30 (IRST)

Cham Mehr-e Bala (Persian: چممهربالا) (Note: Also romanized as Cham Mehr-e Bālā; also known as Chambīr, Cham-ī-Mīr, Cham-ī-Shīr, and Cham Mehr) is a village in Jayedar-e Shomali Rural District (Note: Formerly Jayedar Rural District) of the Central District in Pol-e Dokhtar County, Lorestan province, Iran.

== Demographics ==
=== Population ===
At the time of the 2006 National Census, the village's population was 649 in 142 households. The following census in 2011 counted 612 people in 159 households. The 2016 census measured the population of the village as 540 people in 157 households.
