= Posht-e Tang-e Gol Gol =

Posht-e Tang-e Gol Gol پشت تنگ گل گل
- Village
- Location within Iran
- Coordinates: 33°56′05″N 48°04′36″E
- Country: Iran
- Province: Lorestan
- County: Selseleh
- Bakhsh: Firuzabad
- Rural District: Firuzabad

Population (2006)
  - Total: 15
- Time zone: UTC+3:30 (IRST)
  - Summer (DST): UTC+4:30 (IRDT)

Posht-e Tang-e Gol Gol (Persian: پشت تنگ گل گل, also Romanized as Posht-e Tang-e Gol Gol; also known as Posht-e Tang-e Khayyāţ) is a village in Firuzabad Rural District, Firuzabad District, Selseleh County, Lorestan Province, Iran. At the 2006 census, its population was 15, in 4 families.
