= Khersdar Darreh Dimeh =

Khersdar Darreh Dimeh خرسدردره ديمه
- Village
- Country: Iran
- Province: Lorestan
- County: Khorramabad
- Bakhsh: Zagheh
- Rural District: Qaedrahmat

Population (2006)
  - Total: 32
- Time zone: UTC+3:30 (IRST)
  - Summer (DST): UTC+4:30 (IRDT)

Khersdar Darreh Dimeh (Persian: خرسدردره ديمه, also Romanized as Khersdar Darreh Dīmeh) is a village in Qaedrahmat Rural District, Zagheh District, Khorramabad County, Lorestan Province, Iran. At the 2006 census, its population was 32, in 6 families.
