= Posht Tang, Bijar =

Posht Tang پشت تنگ
- Village
- Location within Iran
- Coordinates: 35°41′16″N 47°13′03″E
- Country: Iran
- Province: Kurdistan
- County: Bijar
- Bakhsh: Central
- Rural District: Najafabad

Population (2006)
  - Total: 136
- Time zone: UTC+3:30 (IRST)
  - Summer (DST): UTC+4:30 (IRDT)

Posht Tang (Persian: پشت تنگ, also Romanized as Posht-e Tang; also known as Poshteh Tang and Pushtang) is a village in Najafabad Rural District, in the Central District of Bijar County, Kurdistan Province, Iran. At the 2006 census, its population was 136, in 31 families. The village is populated by Kurds.
