= Cham-e Gaz, Fars =

Cham-e Gaz چم گز
- Village
- Location within Iran
- Coordinates: 30°12′11″N 51°22′01″E
- Country: Iran
- Province: Fars
- County: Mamasani
- Bakhsh: Central
- Rural District: Bakesh-e Do

Population (2006)
  - Total: 245
- Time zone: UTC+3:30 (IRST)
  - Summer (DST): UTC+4:30 (IRDT)

Cham-e Gaz (Persian: چم گز) is a village in Bakesh-e Do Rural District, in the Central District of Mamasani County, Fars province, Iran. At the 2006 census, its population was 245, in 50 families.
