= Posht Tang-e Chenaran =

Posht Tang-e Chenaran پشت تنگ چناران
- Village
- Location within Iran
- Coordinates: 34°20′27″N 47°32′25″E
- Country: Iran
- Province: Kermanshah
- County: Harsin
- Bakhsh: Bisotun
- Rural District: Shirez

Population (2006)
  - Total: 96
- Time zone: UTC+3:30 (IRST)
  - Summer (DST): UTC+4:30 (IRDT)

Posht Tang-e Chenaran (Persian: پشت تنگ چناران, also Romanized as Posht Tang-e Chenārān; also known as Posht Tang) is a village in Shirez Rural District, Bisotun District, Harsin County, Kermanshah Province, Iran. At the 2006 census, its population was 96, in 19 families.
