= Posht Tang-e Shah Mirza =

Posht Tang-e Shah Mirza پشت تنگ شاه ميرزا
- Village
- Location within Iran
- Coordinates: 33°56′53″N 47°09′03″E
- Country: Iran
- Province: Kermanshah
- County: Kermanshah
- Bakhsh: Firuzabad
- Rural District: Osmanvand

Population (2006)
  - Total: 124
- Time zone: UTC+3:30 (IRST)
  - Summer (DST): UTC+4:30 (IRDT)

Posht Tang-e Shah Mirza (Persian: پشت تنگ شاه ميرزا, also Romanized as Posht Tang-e Shāh Mīrzā; also known as Posht Tang) is a village in Osmanvand Rural District, Firuzabad District, Kermanshah County, Kermanshah Province, Iran. At the 2006 census, its population was 124, in 30 families.
