= Gol-e Sorkh, Chaharmahal and Bakhtiari =

Gol-e Sorkh گل سرخ
- Village
- Location within Iran
- Coordinates: 32°12′13″N 50°17′21″E
- Country: Iran
- Province: Chaharmahal and Bakhtiari
- County: Kuhrang
- Bakhsh: Bazoft
- Rural District: Doab

Population (2006)
  - Total: 53
- Time zone: UTC+3:30 (IRST)
  - Summer (DST): UTC+4:30 (IRDT)

Gol-e Sorkh (Persian: گل سرخ) is a village in Doab Rural District, Bazoft District, Kuhrang County, Chaharmahal and Bakhtiari Province, Iran. At the 2006 census, its population was 53, in 12 families. The village is populated by Lurs.
