= Posht Tang-e Shayengan =

Posht Tang-e Shayengan پشت تنگ شاينگان
- Village
- Location within Iran
- Coordinates: 34°40′26″N 46°24′18″E
- Country: Iran
- Province: Kermanshah
- County: Ravansar
- Bakhsh: Central
- Rural District: Dowlatabad

Population (2006)
  - Total: 47
- Time zone: UTC+3:30 (IRST)
  - Summer (DST): UTC+4:30 (IRDT)

Posht Tang-e Shayengan (Persian: پشت تنگ شاينگان, also Romanized as Posht Tang-e Shāyengān; also known as Posht Tang-e Shāygān) is a village in Dowlatabad Rural District, in the Central District of Ravansar County, Kermanshah Province, Iran. At the 2006 census, its population was 47, including 9 families.
