= Poshtang-e Gari =

Poshtang-e Gari پشت تنگ گاري
- Village
- Location within Iran
- Coordinates: 34°49′23″N 45°55′38″E
- Country: Iran
- Province: Kermanshah
- County: Salas-e Babajani
- Bakhsh: Ozgoleh
- Rural District: Ozgoleh

Population (2006)
  - Total: 161
- Time zone: UTC+3:30 (IRST)
  - Summer (DST): UTC+4:30 (IRDT)

Poshtang-e Gari (Persian: پشت تنگ گاري, also Romanized as Poshtang-e Gārī; also known as Poshtang-e Gāreh) is a village in Ozgoleh Rural District, Ozgoleh District, Salas-e Babajani County, Kermanshah Province, Iran. At the 2006 census, its population was 161, in 34 families.
