= Sarab-e Ganj Ali, Khorramabad =

Sarab-e Ganj Ali سرابگنجعلي
- Village
- Location within Iran
- Coordinates: 33°41′47″N 48°39′12″E
- Country: Iran
- Province: Lorestan
- County: Khorramabad
- Bakhsh: Bayravand
- Rural District: Beyranvand-e Jonubi

Population (2006)
  - Total: 131
- Time zone: UTC+3:30 (IRST)
  - Summer (DST): UTC+4:30 (IRDT)

Sarab-e Ganj Ali (Persian: سرابگنجعلي, also Romanized as Sarāb-e Ganj ‘Ālī, Sarāb-e Ganj‘alī, and Sarāb Ganjāli) is a village in Beyranvand-e Jonubi Rural District, Bayravand District, Khorramabad County, Lorestan Province, Iran. At the 2006 census, its population was 131, in 28 families.
