= Posht Tang-e Cheshmeh Qolijan =

Posht Tang-e Cheshmeh Qolijan پشت تنگ چشمه قلي جان
- Village
- Location within Iran
- Coordinates: 34°39′05″N 46°26′17″E
- Country: Iran
- Province: Kermanshah
- County: Ravansar
- Bakhsh: Central
- Rural District: Dowlatabad

Population (2006)
  - Total: 145
- Time zone: UTC+3:30 (IRST)
  - Summer (DST): UTC+4:30 (IRDT)

Posht Tang Cheshmeh Qolijan

(Persian: پشتنگ چشمه قلی‌جان)

is a mountainous and scenic village located in Dowlatabad Rural District, within the Central District of Ravansar County, Kermanshah Province, Iran.

The village lies on the slopes of the Zagros Mountains, and due to its natural springs, green landscapes, and oak woodlands, it is considered one of the notable natural attractions of the region

== Demographics ==
According to the 1385 (2006) census conducted by the Statistical Center of Iran, the village had a population of 145 people, living in 29 families.
