= Posht Tang-e Olya =

Posht Tang-e Olya پشت تنگ عليا
- Village
- Country: Iran
- Province: Ilam
- County: Chardavol
- Bakhsh: Helilan
- Rural District: Helilan

Population (2006)
  - Total: 337
- Time zone: UTC+3:30 (IRST)
  - Summer (DST): UTC+4:30 (IRDT)

Posht Tang-e Olya (Persian: پشت تنگ عليا, also Romanized as Posht Tang-e ‘Olyā) is a village in Helilan Rural District, Helilan District, Chardavol County, Ilam Province, Iran. At the 2006 census, its population was 337, in 62 families. The village is populated by Kurds.
