= Zuleh, Kermanshah =

Zuleh زوله
- Village
- Location within Iran
- Coordinates: 34°24′50″N 46°22′12″E
- Country: Iran
- Province: Kermanshah
- County: Dalahu
- Bakhsh: Gahvareh
- Rural District: Gurani

Population (2006)
  - Total: 45
- Time zone: UTC+3:30 (IRST)
  - Summer (DST): UTC+4:30 (IRDT)

Zuleh (Persian: زوله, also Romanized as Zūleh) is a village in Gurani Rural District, Gahvareh District, Dalahu County, Kermanshah Province, Iran. At the 2006 census, its population was 45, in 8 families.
