= Posht Tang-e Parian =

Posht Tang-e Parīan پشتتنگپريان
- Village
- Location within Iran
- Coordinates: 33°29′03″N 47°30′19″E
- Country: Iran
- Province: Lorestan
- County: Kuhdasht
- Bakhsh: Central
- Rural District: Gol Gol

Population (2006)
  - Total: 142
- Time zone: UTC+3:30 (IRST)
  - Summer (DST): UTC+4:30 (IRDT)

Posht Tang-e Parīan (Persian: پشتتنگپريان, also Romanized as Posht Tang-e Parīān; also known as Parīān-e Posht Tang, Owlād, Posht-e Tangeh) is a village in Gol Gol Rural District, in the Central District of Kuhdasht County, Lorestan Province, Iran. At the 2006 census, its population was 142, in 30 families.
