= Jayedar-e Jonubi Rural District =

Rural district in Lorestan province, Iran

Jayedar-e Jonubi Rural District Persian: دهستان جایدر جنوبی
- Rural District
- Location within Iran
- Coordinates: 33°05′N 47°44′E
- Country: Iran
- Province: Lorestan
- County: Pol-e Dokhtar
- District: Bala Geriveh
- Established: 2023
- Capital: Gori Balmak
- Time zone: UTC+3:30 (IRST)

Jayedar-e Jonubi Rural District (Persian: دهستان جایدر جنوبی) is in Bala Geriveh District of Pol-e Dokhtar County, Lorestan province, Iran. Its capital is the village of Gori Balmak, whose population at the time of the 2016 National Census was 253 people in 67 households.

== History ==
In 2023, Jelogir Rural District was separated from the Central District in the formation of Bala Geriveh District, and Jayedar-e Jonubi Rural District was created in the new district.

== Other villages in the rural district ==
- Chaleh
- Chalkal-e Sofla
- Chutash-e Yekshanbeh
- Darreh Bagh
- Darreh Shureh
- Deh-e Bozorg
- Garvazir
- Gori Babakhan
- Haft Cheshmeh
- Konar Balut
- Pa Alam
- Qaleh Zanjir
- Sarab-e Rajab
- Saramad
- Tang-e Sistan
- Valieasr
