= Tarhan-e Sharqi Rural District =

Rural district in Lorestan province, Iran

Tarhan-e Sharqi Rural District Persian: دهستان طرهان شرقي
- Rural District
- Location within Iran
- Coordinates: 33°29′N 47°15′E
- Country: Iran
- Province: Lorestan
- County: Kuhdasht
- District: Tarhan
- Established: 1987
- Capital: Garab

Population (2016)
  - Total: 3,909
- Time zone: UTC+3:30 (IRST)

Tarhan-e Sharqi Rural District (Persian: دهستان طرهان شرقي) (Note: Formerly Tarhan Rural District (دهستان طرهان)) is in Tarhan District of Kuhdasht County, Lorestan province, Iran. It is administered from the city of Garab.

== Demographics ==
=== Population ===
At the time of the 2006 National Census, the rural district's population was 5,531 in 1,068 households. There were 5,094 inhabitants in 1,186 households at the following census of 2011. The 2016 census measured the population of the rural district as 3,909 in 1,082 households. The most populous of its 13 villages was Dom Rustan, with 1,113 people.

=== Other villages in the rural district ===
- Bapir Vali Allah
- Garab Kuchek
- Kol-e Sorkh Eidi
- Mireh va Ahmad
- Morad Khan
- Raisvand
