= Jayedar-e Shomali Rural District =

Rural district in Lorestan province, Iran

Jayedar-e Shomali Rural District Persian: دهستان جایدر شمالی
- Rural District
- Location within Iran
- Coordinates: 33°06′53″N 47°40′56″E
- Country: Iran
- Province: Lorestan
- County: Pol-e Dokhtar
- District: Central
- Established: 1987
- Capital: Rahimabad

Population (2016)
  - Total: 10,803
- Time zone: UTC+3:30 (IRST)

Jayedar-e Shomali Rural District (Persian: دهستان جایدر شمالی) (Note: Formerly Jayedar Rural District (Persian: دهستان جايدر)) is in the Central District of Pol-e Dokhtar County, Lorestan province, Iran. Its capital is the village of Rahimabad. The previous capital of the rural district was the village of Valieasr, (Note: Now in Jayedar-e Jonubi Rural District of Bala Geriveh District) transferred from the original capital, the village of Sarab Hammam, upon the latter's conversion to a city.

== Demographics ==
=== Population ===
At the time of the 2006 National Census, the rural district's population (as Jayedar Rural District) was 10,727 in 2,227 households. There were 10,388 inhabitants in 2,614 households at the following census of 2011. The 2016 census measured the population of the rural district as 10,803 in 3,093 households. The most populous of its 40 villages was Sarab Hammam (now a city), with 4,054 people.

=== Other villages in the rural district ===
- Baba Khvarazm-e Bala
- Baba Khvarazm-e Karim
- Baba Khvarazm-e Mojir
- Bagh-e Bala
- Bagh-e Sofla
- Cham Gerdeleh-ye Olya
- Cham Gerdeleh-ye Sofla
- Cham Gerdeleh-ye Vosta
- Cham Mehr-e Bala
- Cham Mehr-e Pain
- Cham Qaleh
- Cham Rastamian
- Do Kuheh-ye Rashnow
- Eslamabad-e Olya
- Halush
- Meydan-e Bozorg
- Sarab-e Jahangir
