= Tarhan-e Gharbi Rural District =

Rural district in Lorestan province, Iran

Tarhan-e Gharbi Rural District Persian: دهستان طرهان غربي
- Rural District
- Location within Iran
- Coordinates: 33°32′N 47°02′E
- Country: Iran
- Province: Lorestan
- County: Kuhdasht
- District: Tarhan
- Established: 2003
- Capital: Choghapit

Population (2016)
  - Total: 5,526
- Time zone: UTC+3:30 (IRST)

Tarhan-e Gharbi Rural District (Persian: دهستان طرهان غربي) is in Tarhan District of Kuhdasht County, Lorestan province, Iran. Its capital is the village of Choghapit.

== Demographics ==
=== Population ===
At the time of the 2006 National Census, the rural district's population was 8,847 in 1,703 households. There were 7,807 inhabitants in 1,756 households at the following census of 2011. The 2016 census measured the population of the rural district as 5,526 in 1,465 households. The most populous of its 27 villages was Cheshmeh Sefid, with 761 people.

=== Other villages in the rural district ===
- Chah-e Kheyreh
- Choghapit-e Bala
- Qebleh
- Seyyed Karim-e Kushki
- Tang-e Kabud-e Golabi
- Zuleh
