= Malavi Rural District =

Rural district in Lorestan province, Iran

Malavi Rural District Persian: دهستان ملاوی
- Rural District
- Location within Iran
- Coordinates: 33°15′N 47°46′E
- Country: Iran
- Province: Lorestan
- County: Pol-e Dokhtar
- District: Central
- Established: 1987
- Capital: Murani

Population (2016)
  - Total: 8,489
- Time zone: UTC+3:30 (IRST)

Malavi Rural District (Persian: دهستان ملاوی) is in the Central District of Pol-e Dokhtar County, Lorestan province, Iran. Its capital is the village of Murani.

== Demographics ==
=== Population ===
At the time of the 2006 National Census, the rural district's population was 8,923 in 2,010 households. There were 8,692 inhabitants in 2,301 households at the following census of 2011. The 2016 census measured the population of the rural district as 8,489 in 2,543 households. The most populous of its 31 villages was Murani, with 1,770 people.

=== Other villages in the rural district ===
- Baba Zeyd
- Gol Gol-e Sofla
- Jolgeh-ye Khalaj-e Olya
- Khersdar-e Sofla
- Kolivand
- Paran Parviz
- Vareh Zard
