= Jelogir Rural District =

Rural district in Lorestan province, Iran

Jelogir Rural District Persian: دهستان جلوگير
- Rural District
- Location within Iran
- Coordinates: 32°51′N 48°00′E
- Country: Iran
- Province: Lorestan
- County: Pol-e Dokhtar
- District: Bala Geriveh
- Established: 1987
- Capital: Jelogir

Population (2016)
  - Total: 3,896
- Time zone: UTC+3:30 (IRST)

Jelogir Rural District (Persian: دهستان جلوگير) is in Bala Geriveh District of Pol-e Dokhtar County, Lorestan province, Iran. Its capital is the village of Jelogir. The previous capital of the rural district was the village of Pa Alam, now in Jayedar-e Jonubi Rural District.

== Demographics ==
=== Population ===
At the time of the 2006 National Census, the rural district's population (as a part of the Central District) was 5,368 in 1,118 households. There were 4,999 inhabitants in 1,221 households at the following census of 2011. The 2016 census measured the population of the rural district as 3,896 in 1,075 households. The most populous of its 41 villages was Pa Alam (now in Jayedar-e Jonubi Rural District), with 1,010 people.

In 2023, the rural district was separated from the district in the formation of Bala Geriveh District.

=== Other villages in the rural district ===
- Akhurrakhash
- Borj-e Kabud
- Cham Gaz
- Cham Gerdab
- Chin Zal
- Darreh Khazineh
- Darreh Naqi
- Kul Chap
- Pasgolam
- Rangin Ban
- Sargrefteh
- Taleqan
