= Miyankuh-e Gharbi Rural District =

Rural district in Lorestan province, Iran

Miyankuh-e Gharbi Rural District Persian: دهستان ميانكوه غربي
- Rural District
- Location within Iran
- Coordinates: 33°06′N 48°04′E
- Country: Iran
- Province: Lorestan
- County: Pol-e Dokhtar
- District: Central
- Established: 1987
- Capital: Vashian-e Nasir Tappeh

Population (2016)
  - Total: 2,434
- Time zone: UTC+3:30 (IRST)

Miyankuh-e Gharbi Rural District (Persian: دهستان ميانكوه غربي) is in the Central District of Pol-e Dokhtar County, Lorestan province, Iran. Its capital is the village of Vashian-e Nasir Tappeh.

== Demographics ==
=== Population ===
At the time of the 2006 National Census, the rural district's population was 2,990 in 616 households. There were 3,211 inhabitants in 738 households at the following census of 2011. The 2016 census measured the population of the rural district as 2,434 in 674 households. The most populous of its 71 villages was Vashian-e Nasir Tappeh, with 409 people.

=== Other villages in the rural district ===
- Ab Zahreh Pirmar
- Dulabi-ye Badamak
- Makineh Nasiri
- Qaleh-ye Mishvand
- Takht Ab
- Vashian-e Cheshmeh Shirin
- Vashian-e Takht Shir
