= Tarhan District =

District in Lorestan province, Iran

Tarhan District Persian: بخش طرهان
- District
- Location within Iran
- Coordinates: 33°31′N 47°06′E
- Country: Iran
- Province: Lorestan
- County: Kuhdasht
- Established: 1989
- Capital: Garab

Population (2016)
  - Total: 12,730
- Time zone: UTC+3:30 (IRST)

Tarhan District (Persian: بخش طرهان) is in Kuhdasht County, Lorestan province, Iran. Its capital is the city of Garab.

== Demographics ==
=== Population ===
At the time of the 2006 National Census, the district's population was 17,648 in 3,458 households. The following census in 2011 counted 16,101 people in 3,766 households. The 2016 census measured the population of the district as 12,730 inhabitants in 3,513 households.

=== Administrative divisions ===
Tarhan District Population
| Administrative Divisions | 2006 | 2011 | 2016 |
|---|---|---|---|
| Tarhan-e Gharbi RD | 8,847 | 7,807 | 5,526 |
| Tarhan-e Sharqi RD (Note: Formerly Tarhan Rural District) | 5,531 | 5,094 | 3,909 |
| Garab (city) | 3,270 | 3,200 | 3,295 |
| Total | 17,648 | 16,101 | 12,730 |
RD = Rural District
