= Bala Geriveh District =

District in Lorestan province, Iran

Bala Geriveh District Persian: بخش بالاگریوه
- District
- Location within Iran
- Coordinates: 32°52′N 47°59′E
- Country: Iran
- Province: Lorestan
- County: Pol-e Dokhtar
- Established: 2023
- Capital: Valieasr
- Time zone: UTC+3:30 (IRST)

Bala Geriveh District (Persian: بخش بالاگریوه) is in Pol-e Dokhtar County, Lorestan province, Iran. Its capital is the village of Valieasr, whose population at the time of the 2016 National Census was 975 people in 276 households.

== History ==
In 2023, Jelogir Rural District was separated from the Central District in the formation of Bala Geriveh District.

== Demographics ==
=== Administrative divisions ===
Bala Geriveh District
Administrative Divisions
Jayedar-e Jonubi RD
Jelogir RD
RD = Rural District
