= Central District (Pol-e Dokhtar County) =

District in Lorestan province, Iran

Central District (Pol-e Dokhtar County) Persian: بخش مرکزی شهرستان پلدختر
- District
- Location within Iran
- Coordinates: 33°00′N 47°56′E
- Country: Iran
- Province: Lorestan
- County: Pol-e Dokhtar
- Established: 1994
- Capital: Pol-e Dokhtar

Population (2016)
  - Total: 51,974
- Time zone: UTC+3:30 (IRST)

The Central District of Pol-e Dokhtar County (Persian: بخش مرکزی شهرستان پلدختر) is in Lorestan province, Iran. Its capital is the city of Pol-e Dokhtar.

== History ==
The village of Sarab Hammam was converted to a city in 2020. In 2023, Jelogir Rural District was separated from the district in the formation of Bala Geriveh District.

== Demographics ==
=== Population ===
At the time of the 2006 National Census, the district's population was 50,596 in 11,102 households. The following census in 2011 counted 52,382 people in 13,370 households. The 2016 census measured the population of the district as 51,974 inhabitants in 14,948 households.

=== Administrative divisions ===
Central District (Pol-e Dokhtar County) Population
Administrative Divisions	2006	2011	2016
Jayedar-e Shomali RD (Note: Formerly Jayedar Rural District)	10,727	10,388	10,803
Jelogir RD (Note: Transferred to Bala Geriveh District after the 2016 census)	5,368	4,999	3,896
Malavi RD	8,923	8,692	8,489
Miyankuh-e Gharbi RD	2,990	3,211	2,434
Pol-e Dokhtar (city)	22,588	25,092	26,352
Sarab Hammam (city) (Note: Became a city after the 2016 census)			
Total	50,596	52,382	51,974
RD = Rural District
