= Gurab =

Gurab or Goorab or Gorab or Gorrab (Persian: گوراب) may refer to:

- Gurab, Fars
- Gurab, Rostam, Fars Province
- Gurab, Rasht, Gilan Province
- Gurab, Sowme'eh Sara, Gilan Province
- Gurab Javar, Gilan Province
- Gurab-e Lishavandan, Gilan Province
- Gurab Varzal, Gilan Province
- Gorab, Ilam
- Gurab-e Jomeh, Kerman Province
- Gurab, Andika, Khuzestan Province
- Gurab, Izeh, Khuzestan Province
- Gurab, Susan, Izeh County, Khuzestan Province
- Gurab-e Sorkh, Khuzestan Province
- Gurab, Boyer-Ahmad, Kohgiluyeh and Boyer-Ahmad Province
- Gurab, Kohgiluyeh, Kohgiluyeh and Boyer-Ahmad Province
- Gurab, Qaen, South Khorasan Province
- Gurab, Yazd
- Gurab-e Olya (disambiguation), two locations, Ilam Province
- Gurab-e Sofla (disambiguation), two locations, Ilam Province
- Gurab Dagchi
- Gurab Zarmikh
- The term gurab is also a variation of Grab (ship).

== See also ==
- Garab (disambiguation)
