= Garab =

== In Morocco ==
- Garrab (Moroccan Arabic: ڭرّاب): a person who practices Tagarrabt

== In the Philippines ==
- Talibong (sword), a type of sword also known as garab

== Locations ==
Garab or Gar Ab or Garrab (Persian: گر آب) may refer to:

- Gar Ab, Alborz
- Garab, Chaharmahal and Bakhtiari
- Gar Ab, Hormozgan
- Garab, Ilam
- Garab, alternate name of Pagal-e Garab, Ilam Province
- Garab Khvoshadul, Ilam Province
- Garrab-e Olya, Kermanshah
- Garab, Khuzestan
- Garab, Behbahan, Khuzestan Province
- Garab, Kohgiluyeh and Boyer-Ahmad
- Garab Dishmuk, Kohgiluyeh and Boyer-Ahmad Province
- Garab, Lorestan
- Garab, Khorramabad, Lorestan Province
- Garab Kuchek, Lorestan Province
- Garab, Mashhad, Razavi Khorasan Province
- Garab, Nishapur, Razavi Khorasan Province
- Garab, Sabzevar, Razavi Khorasan Province
- Garáb, village in Hungary

== See also ==
- Garab-e Olya (disambiguation)
- Gurab (disambiguation)
