= Garmab (disambiguation) =

Garmab is a city in Zanjan Province, Iran.

Garmab or Garm Ab (Persian: گرماب) may also refer to other places in Iran:

- Garmab, Alborz
- Garmab Dasht, Gilan Province
- Garm Ab Sara, Gilan Province
- Garmab, alternate name of Garmeh, Isfahan, Isfahan Province
- Garmab, Kerman
- Garmab, Kermanshah
- Garmab, Khuzestan
- Garm Ab, Kohgiluyeh and Boyer-Ahmad
- Garmab, Baneh, Kurdistan Province
- Garmab, Kamyaran, Kurdistan Province
- Garmab, Markazi
- Garmab, Faruj, North Khorasan Province
- Garmab, Maneh and Samalqan, North Khorasan Province
- Garmab, Shirvan, North Khorasan Province
- Garmab, Firuzeh, Razavi Khorasan Province
- Garmab, Torbat-e Heydarieh, Razavi Khorasan Province
- Garmab-e Shahzadeh, Razavi Khorasan Province
- Garmab-e Bala, Semnan Province
- Garmab-e Pain, Semnan Province
- Garmab, South Khorasan
- Garmab-e Olya, West Azerbaijan Province
- Garmab Rural District, in Mazandaran Province

== See also ==
- Garm Ab, Afghanistan
