= History of hide materials =

Development of animal-hide processing throughout human history

Hide processing in human history
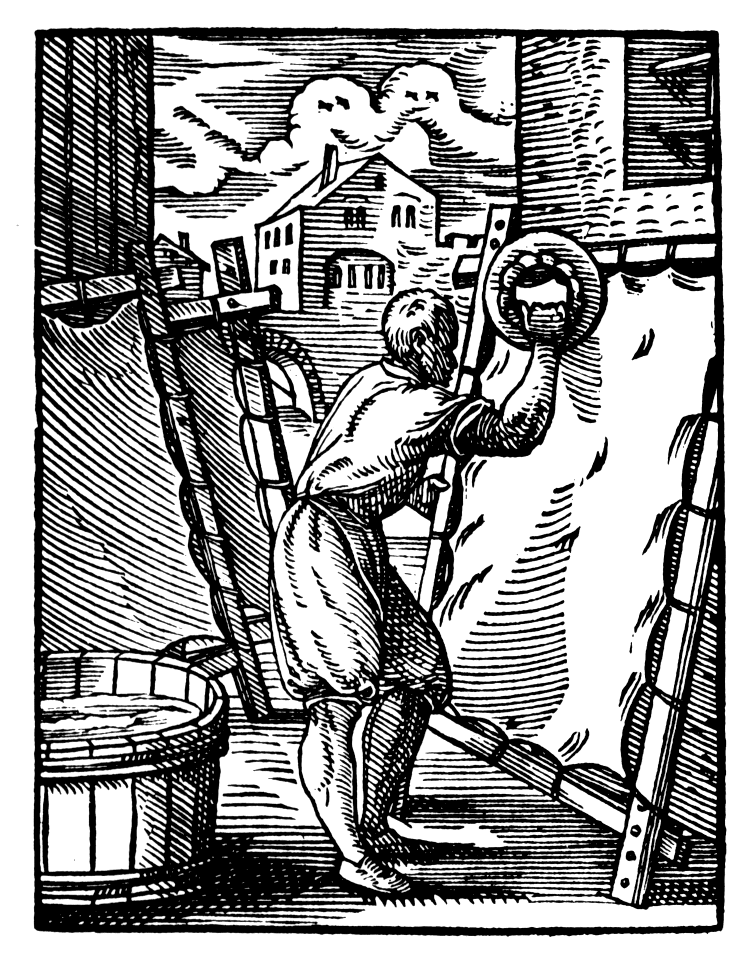
- A German parchmenter at work c. 1568. The use of animal hides for writing materials like parchment was a key development.

Key developments
- Prehistoric: Rawhide, Tanning, Fur clothing
- Ancient: Parchment, Vellum, Systematic Tanning
- Medieval: Guild systems, Welt shoes, Suede
- Modern: Patent leather, chromium tanning, synthetic leather

Related fields
- Social sciences: Anthropology; Archaeology; Economic history; Environmental history
- Technology & Industry: Animal husbandry; Chemical engineering; History of technology; Industrial Revolution
- Cultural practices: Clothing; Bookbinding; Writing; Saddlery

Humanity has used animal hides since the Paleolithic (beginning approximately 400,000 years ago) for clothing, mobile shelters such as tipis and wigwams, and household items. Since ancient times, hides have also been used as a writing medium in the form of parchment.

Fur clothing was used by other hominids (at least the Neanderthals), although their use was probably limited to rudimentary capes based on thermal-modeling studies that indicate the necessity of additional insulation for survival in glacial climates. Rawhide is a simple hide product which stiffens. Formerly used for binding pieces of wood together, it is primarily found in drum skins.

Tanning of hides to manufacture leather was invented during the Paleolithic, with the earliest evidence of hide-processing tools found at Hoxne in England and Qesem cave, Israel, dating to about 400,000 years ago.

Parchment for writing was introduced during the Bronze Age, and was later refined into vellum before paper became common.

== Prehistoric and ancient use ==
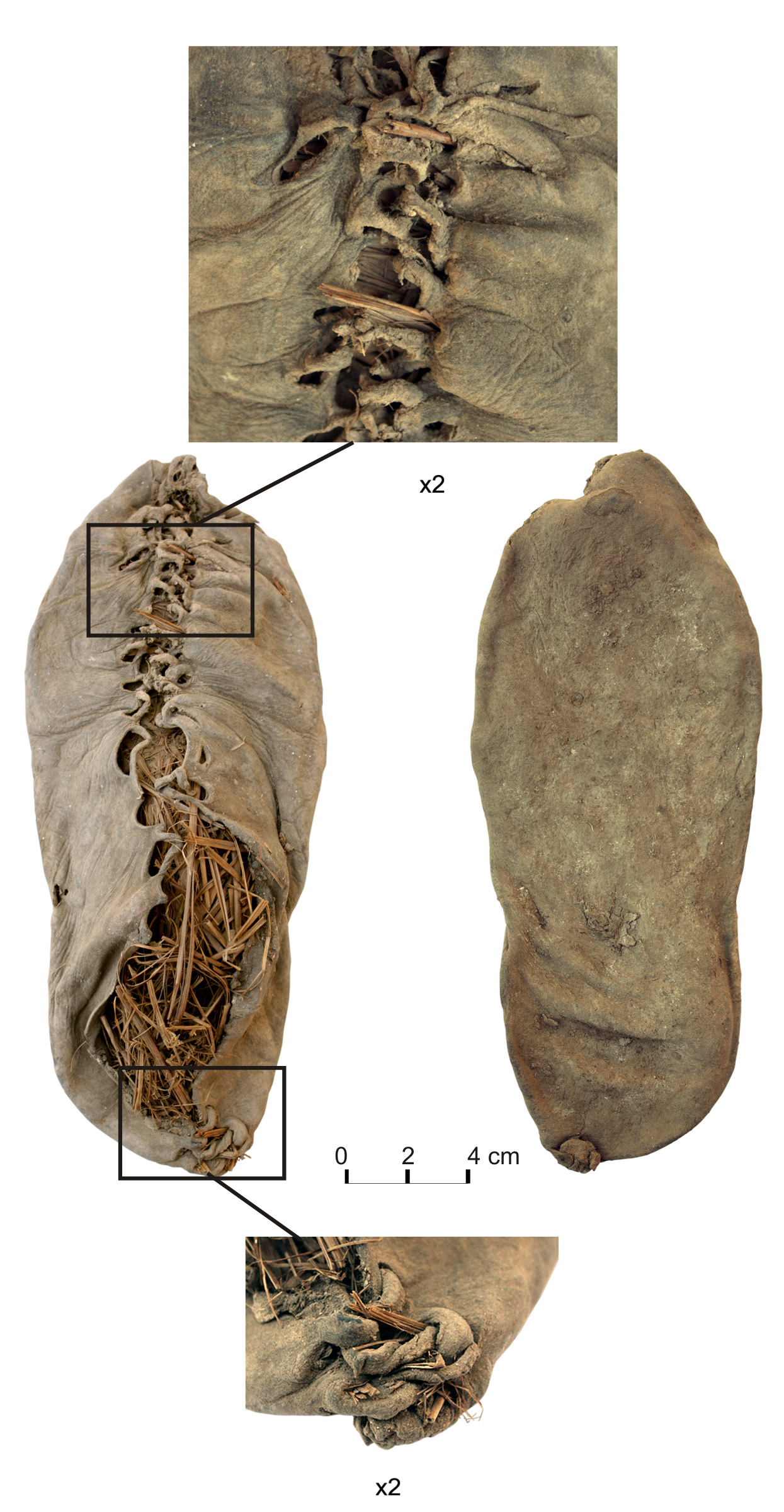
A leather shoe, discovered at Areni-1 cave in Armenia and dating to approximately 3,500 BCE

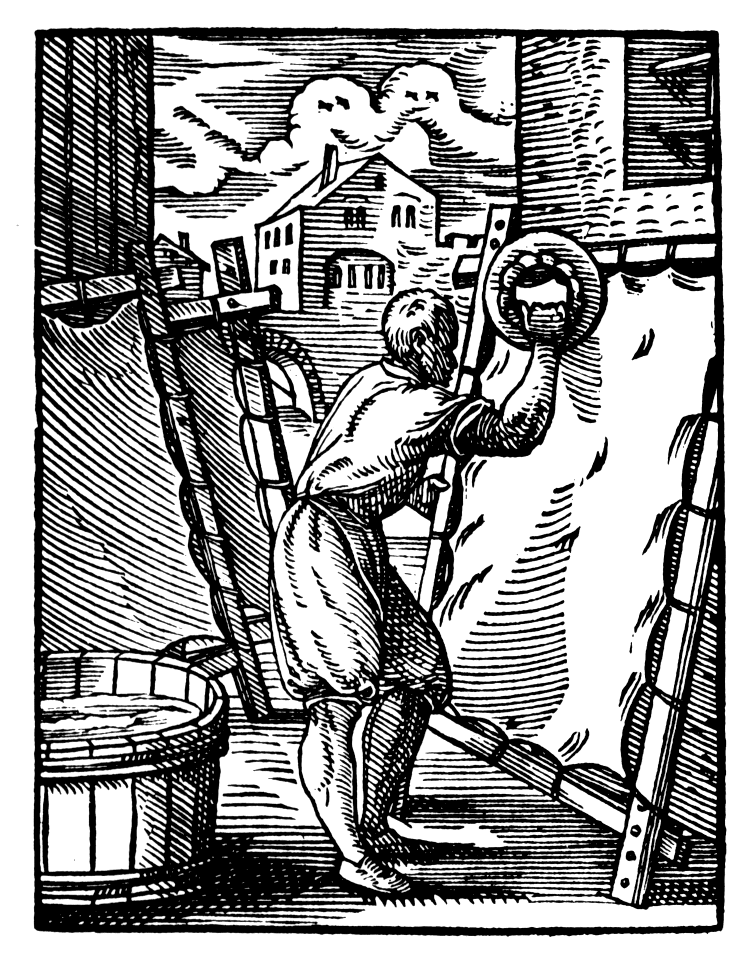
A 16th-century German parchment-maker

The Australian National University's Ian Gilligan wrote that hominids without fur would have needed leather clothing to survive outside the tropics in mid-latitude Eurasia, southern Africa and the Levant during the cold glacial and stadial periods of the Ice Age, and there is archaeological evidence for the use of hide and leather in the Paleolithic. Simple, unmodified stone flakes could have been used to scrape hides for tanning, but scraper tools are more specialized for tasks such as woodworking and hideworking. Both of these stone-tool shapes were invented in the Oldowan, but direct evidence for hideworking has not been found before about 400,000 years ago. Examination of microscopic use-wear on scrapers demonstrates they were used to prepare hides at that time at Hoxne in England.

The earliest known bone awls date to 84,000 to 72,000 years ago in South Africa, and their use-wear shows that they were probably used to pierce soft materials such as tanned leather. Bone awls were later made in the Aurignacian in Europe, west Asia and Russia, and in Tasmania during the Last Glacial Maximum. The earliest eyed sewing needles date to 43,000 to 28,500 years ago (probably at least 35,000 years ago) in southern Siberia, and were used across Paleolithic Eurasia and in North America. Paleolithic hunters are also known to have targeted fur-bearing animals such as wolves and arctic foxes in Europe, snow leopards in Central Asia, mole-rats in Africa, and red-necked wallabies in Tasmania.

As animal husbandry was introduced during the Neolithic, human communities had a steady source of hides. The oldest confirmed leather-tanning tools were found in ancient Sumer and date to approximately 5000 BCE. The oldest surviving piece of leather footwear is the Areni-1 shoe which was made in Armenia around 3500 BCE. Another (possibly older) piece of leather was found in Guitarrero Cave in northern Peru, dating to the Archaic period.

The first written references to leather are documented from Ancient Egypt around 1300 BCE. Archaeologists have discovered evidence of tanned and treated animal skins in Badarian and pre-dynastic Egyptian graves. Artistic depictions of leather-working appear in tombs as early as the Fifth Dynasty. The archaeological record of the Nile Valley provides examples of the development of methods of tanning and treating hides and skins which include drying, smoke- and salt-curing, and softening with fat, urine, dung, brain, and oils.

== Medieval use ==
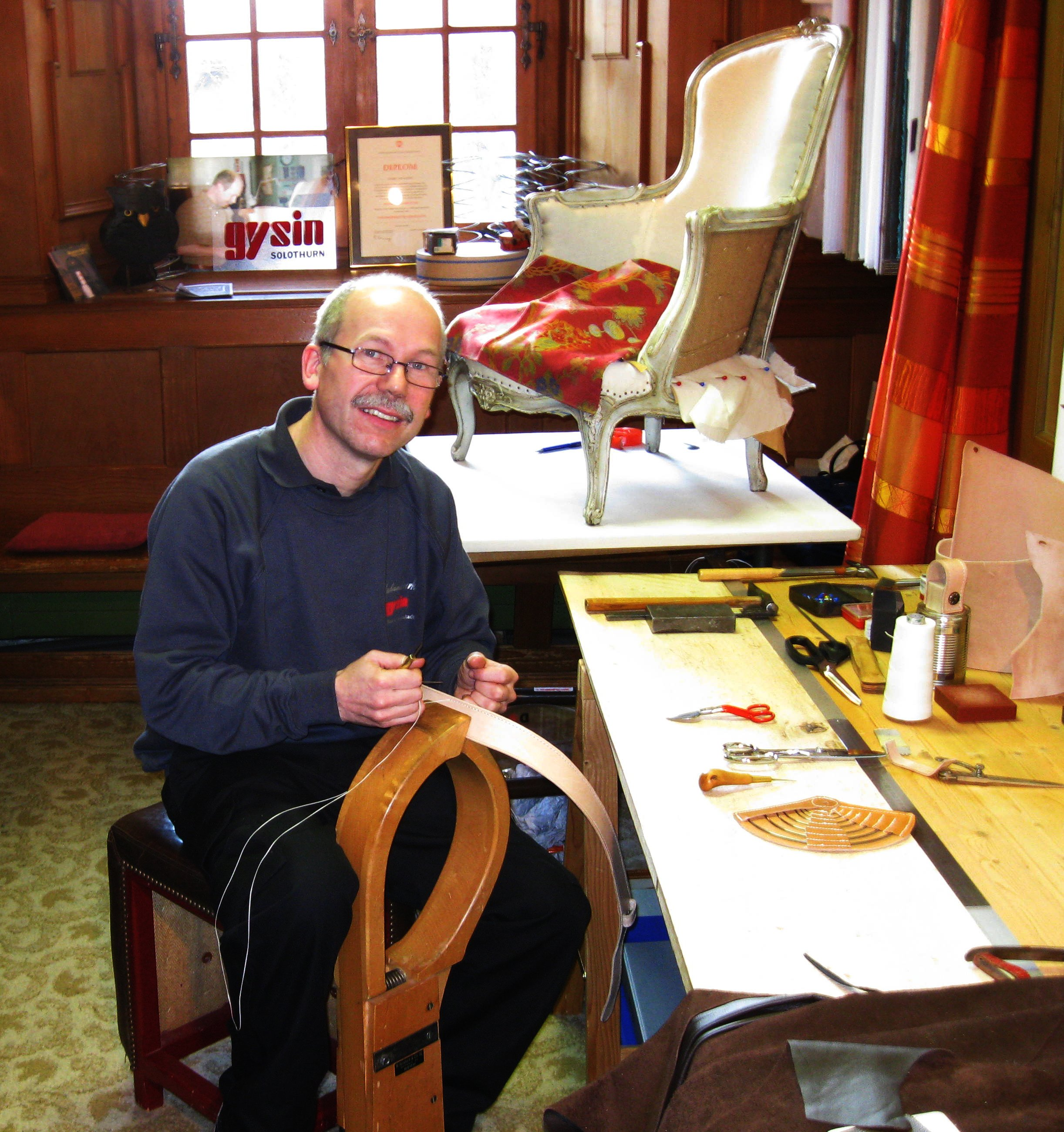
Medieval leather-working techniques persist; saddlery and upholstery are examples.

During the Middle Ages, leather-craft developed through organized guild systems which standardized production methods and quality control across Europe. Archaeological excavations at sites such as Norwich, Dublin and York have revealed evidence of specialized tanning quarters with organized workshops, indicating the establishment of dedicated industrial areas for hide processing.

The medieval tanning process was labor-intensive and time-consuming, typically requiring 12 to 18 months to complete. The process involved multiple stages: initial hide preparation through soaking and hair removal, treatment with lime solutions, and gradual tanning using oak-bark extracts in increasingly-concentrated solutions. This vegetable-tanning method produced durable leather suitable for a number of applications including footwear, armor, book bindings, and household items.

Specialized leather products were developed during this period which included welt shoes and turnshoes, representing advances in footwear construction. Refined-leather types such as suede and nubuck were also introduced, demonstrating the increasing sophistication of medieval leather-working techniques.

== Modern use ==
The Industrial Revolution brought fundamental changes to leather production through mechanization and chemical innovation. Steam-powered machinery replaced manual labor for many processes, and new chemical treatments increased the efficiency of tanning methods. Patent leather production began in 1793 and was commercialized in the United States by 1819, based on an adaptation of European production methods.

A major advancement in hide processing occurred in 1858 with the invention of chromium tanning by German technologist Friedrich Knapp and Swedish scientist Carl Hyltén-Cavallius; American chemist Augustus Schultz first patented the process using alkaline chromium(III) sulfate as the tanning agent. This process reduced tanning time from months to days and produced leather with different properties than traditional vegetable tanning, including increased water resistance and flexibility. By the 20th century, chromium tanning accounted for approximately 85% of all leather manufacturing.

Contemporary leather production employs traditional vegetable tanning and modern chromium processes, with increased attention to environmental sustainability. Alternative tanning methods using synthetic materials and plant-based chemicals have been developed to address environmental concerns associated with chromium processing. Modern leather has applications in the automotive, fashion, furniture, and specialty industries, with quality standards and production methods regulated by international organizations. Several kinds of synthetic leather have been developed during the 20th and 21st centuries as alternatives to animal-derived materials, driven by cost considerations, ethical concerns, and performance requirements in specific applications.

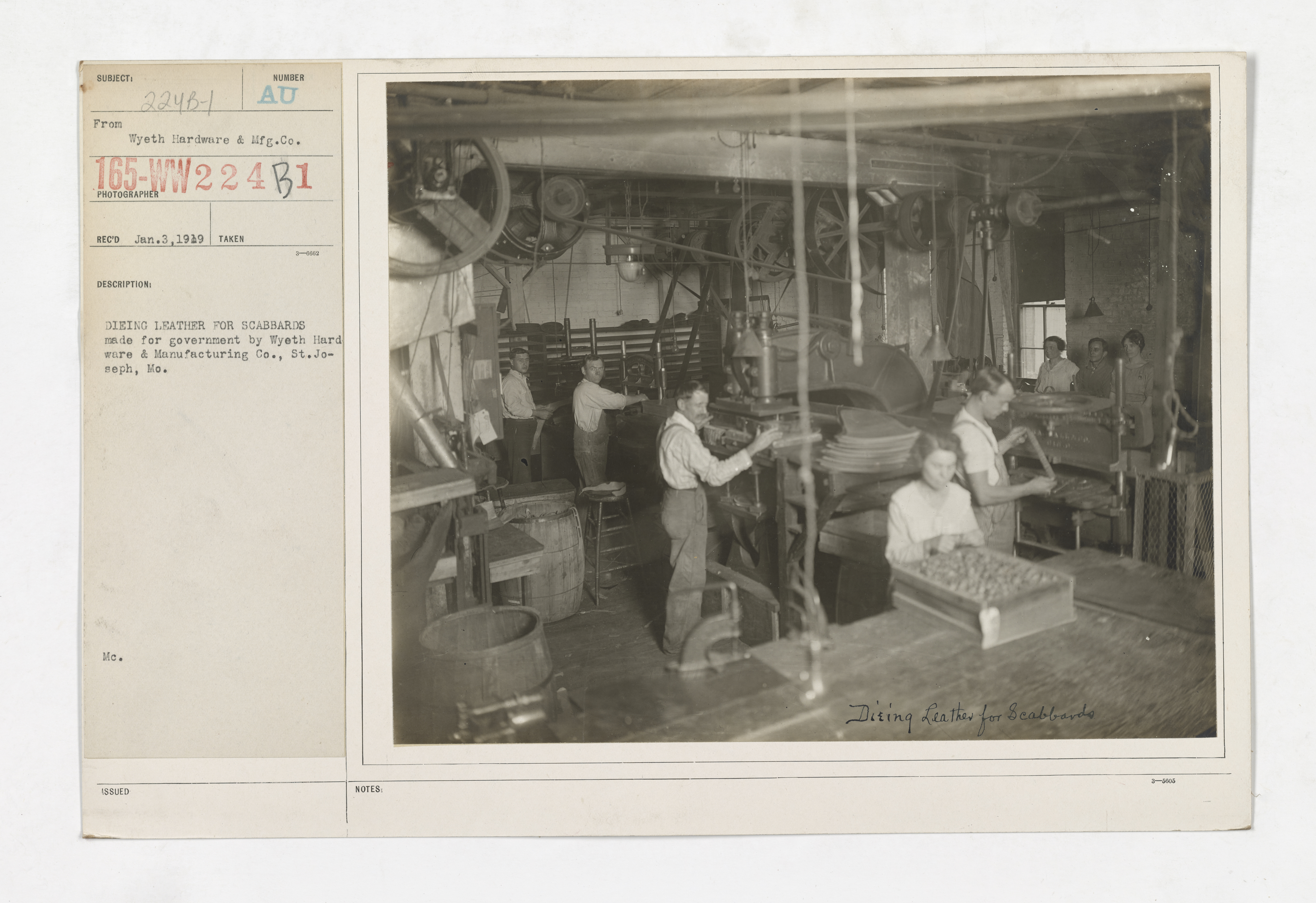
Industrial leather dyeing during World War I, showing mechanized production methods

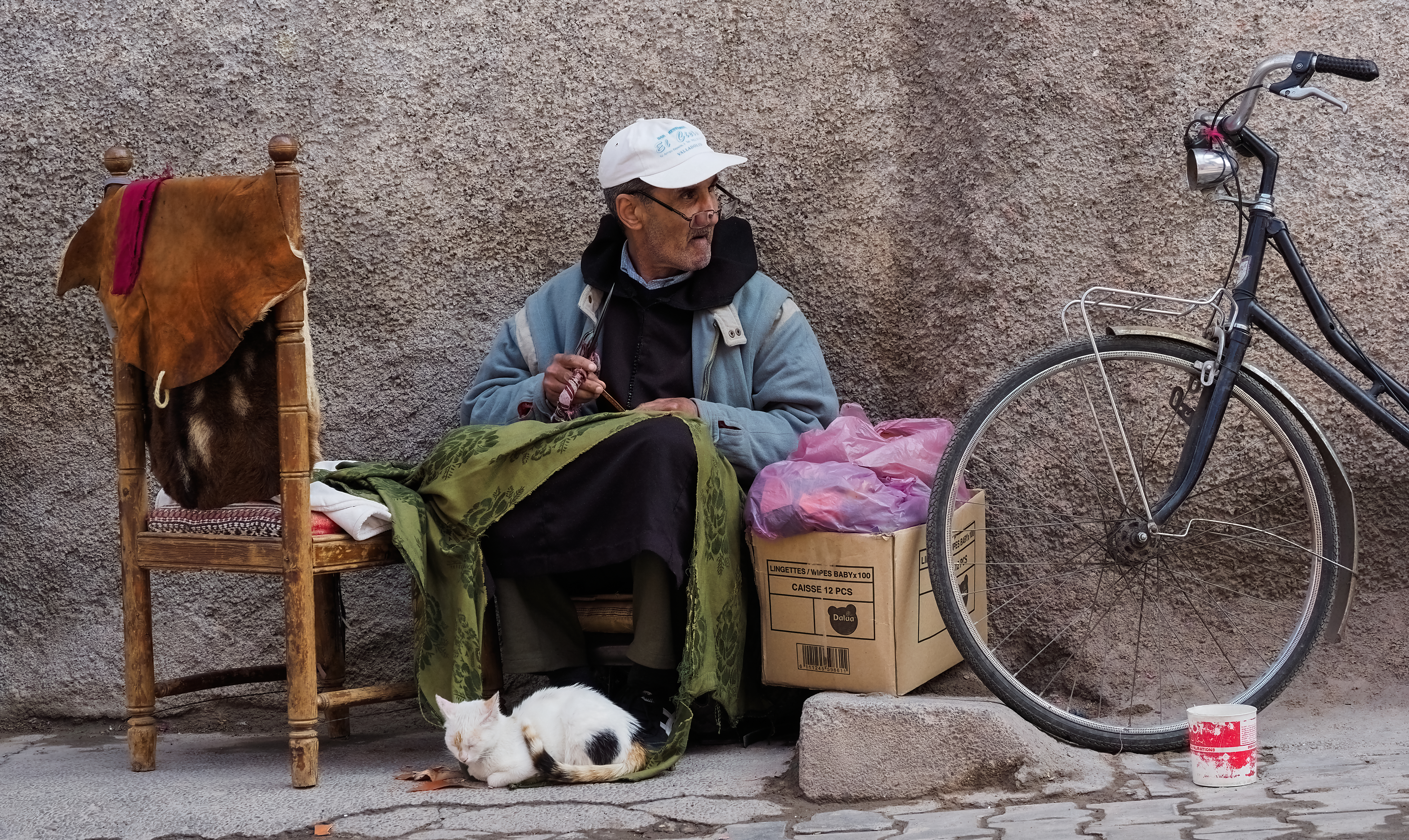
Traditional tanning methods continue in some regions, as evidenced by this tanner in Marrakesh.

== See also ==
- Boiled leather
- Bota bag
- Buckskin
- Colambre
- Goatskin (material)
- History of clothing and textiles
- Parfleche
- Plains hide painting
- Waterskin
