= Goatskin =

Goatskin may refer to:

- Goatskin (material), the skin of a goat or the leather made from it
- a wineskin made from goat leather
