= Garab-e Olya =

Garab-e Olya or Garrab-e Olya (Persian: گراب عليا) may refer to:

- Garrab-e Olya, Kermanshah
- Garab-e Olya, Khuzestan
- Garab-e Olya, Kohgiluyeh and Boyer-Ahmad
- Garab-e Olya, Lorestan
- Garab-e Olya, alternate name of Garab Kuchek, Lorestan Province
