= Tagarrabt =

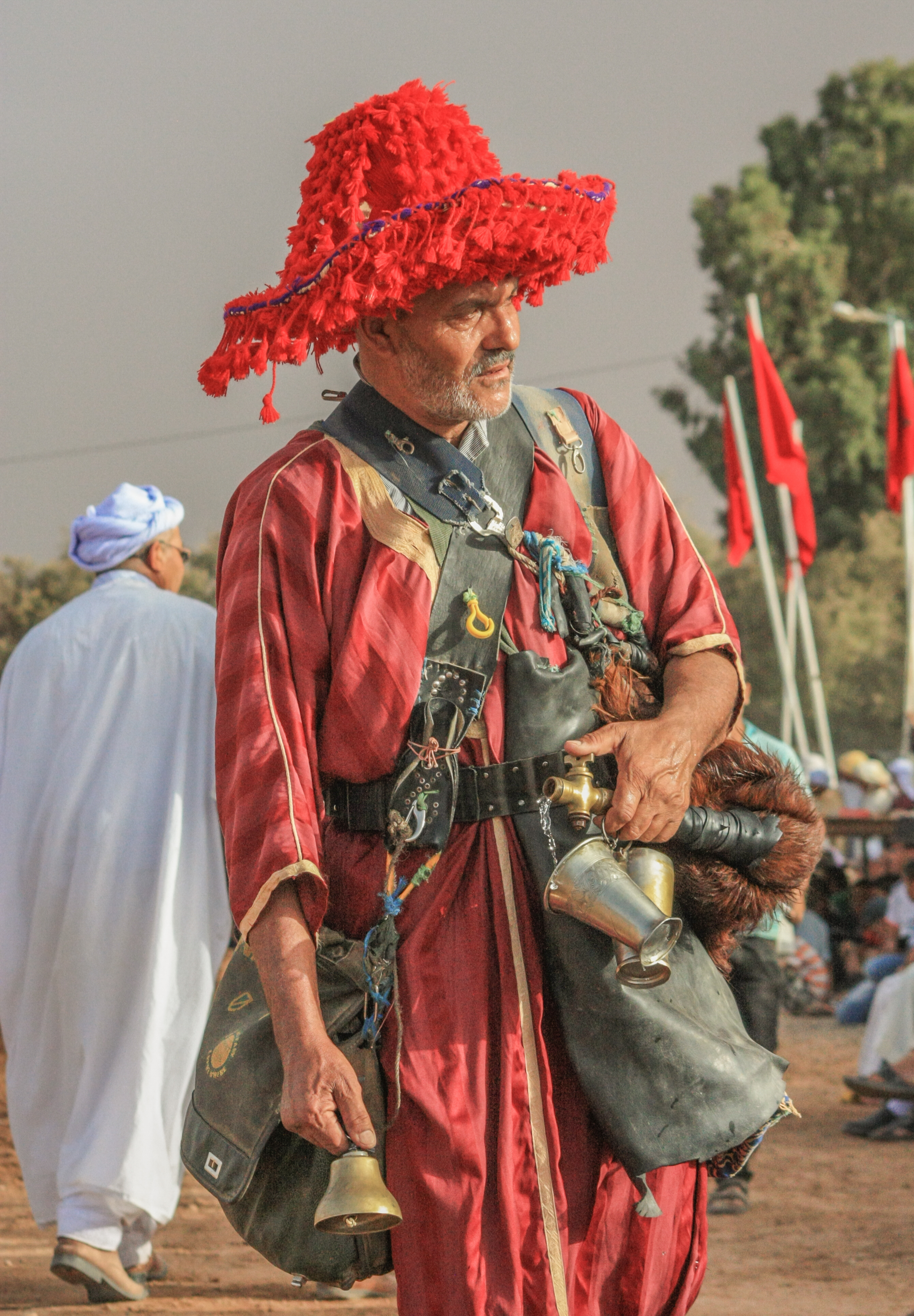
A garrab at Ain Bni Mathar, Morocco

A garrab (Moroccan Arabic: ڭرّاب or قرّاب) or guerrab is a water porter in Morocco. The traditional profession, referred to as tagarrabt (Moroccan Arabic: تاڭرابت), involves selling and distributing water in public spaces, and it is currently in danger of extinction.

Traditionally, the garrab wears a red djellaba, and a matching large ornate hat. He carries a goatskin bag (Arabic: قِرْبَة qirba or girba) with cold fresh water, and brass cups to serve water. They usually carry a bell, and have a distinct call, invoking religious themes or the good properties of the water, to attract the attention of passers-by.

Tagarrabt was historically practiced as a semi-charitable work. Garrabs would give water to anyone who needed it, but would also accept donations.

The profession of water selling existed, possibly under different names, throughout North Africa, from Morocco to Egypt.

== Etymology ==
The exact origin of the term "garrab" is disputed, though it likely has Arabic origin. The etymology could be from قرب, to come/bring close or to be almost full. The term may have also derived from قربة, qirba, which is the waterskin carried by garabs.

In Moroccan Arabic, the term "garrab" has a second meaning referring to an illegal alcohol seller.

== History ==
Garrabs from Marrakesh, c. 1929

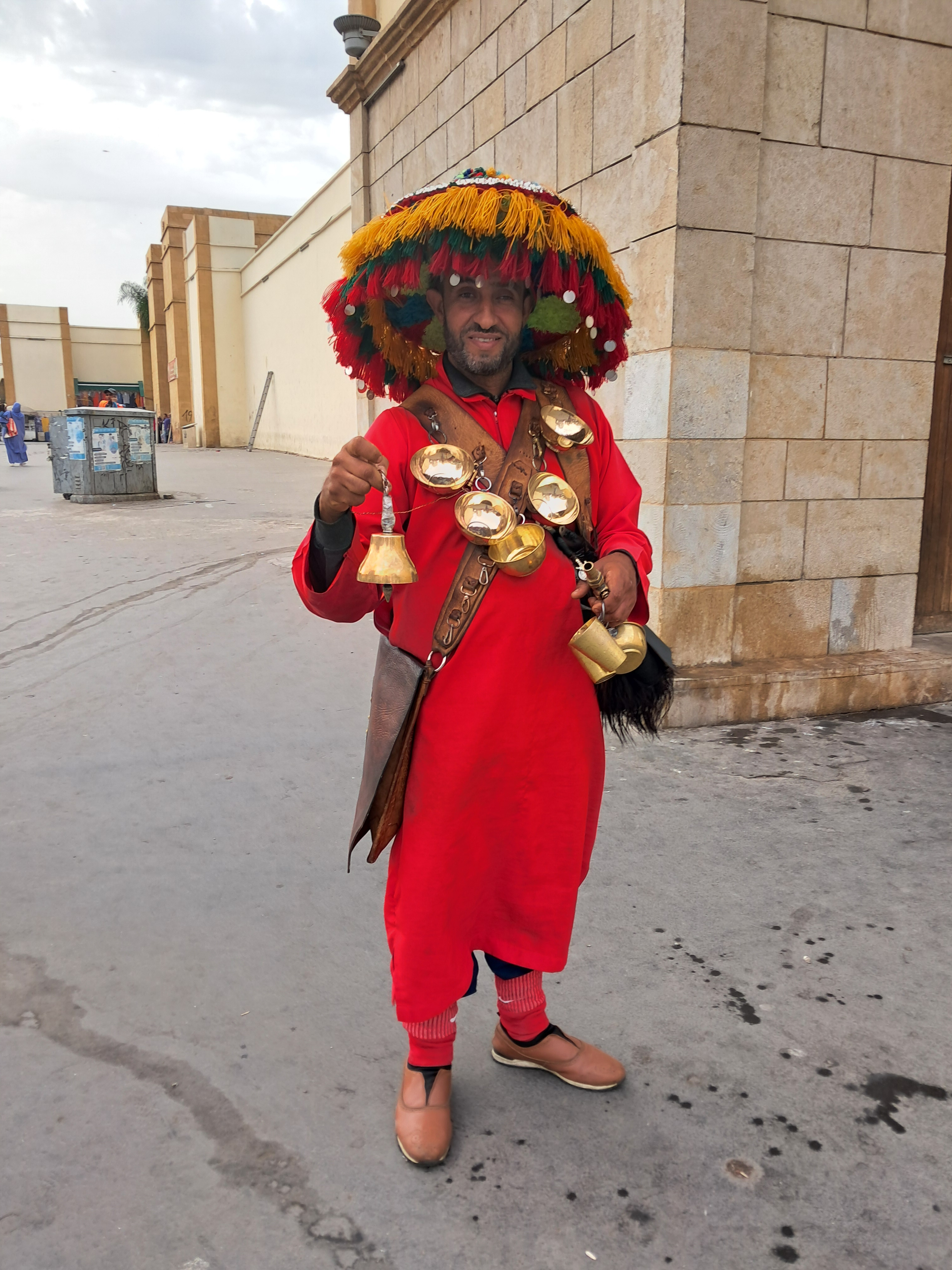
A garrab near the Old Medina of Casablanca

Despite its apparent ancientness, the profession of Tagarrabat was mostly ignored by Moroccan historians, possibly due to its low prestige. The exception being a passing mention by Mohamed Ben El Kacem Es-Sebti that would place it in 15th century Ceuta. French archaeologist Raymond Thouvenot on the other hand, suggested older roots to the profession, when he commented on the craftsmanship of a statue of a water porter in Volubilis, going back to the Roman period, which he believes was made after a live model.

Pictures showing garrabs were taken by European explorers from the 19th century, and with the beginning of the French protectorate in Morocco (1912), French scholars took interest in different aspects of Moroccan society, including tagarrabt.

One scholar, Alexandre Joly, who studied professions in Tétouan between 1906 and 1912, mentioned that practitioners of tagarrabt wore short djellabas, and walked barefoot. Only four garrabs existed in Tetouan, according to his study, and they were originally from Sous or Marrakesh.

According to Arabist Georges Séraphin Colin, garrabs were generally often from the regions of Draa or Tafilalt. They supplied homes in urban areas with fresh water in the morning, before going to the Souk to provide water to passers-by in their goatskins and brass cups.

In Marrakesh, there were two groups of garrabs: one group distributed water in residence districts, and carried the skins on their shoulders or on the backs of donkeys. The water usually came from fountains, namely Mouassine Fountain. The other group focused on Souks and public squares, such as Jemaa el-Fnaa, and they filled their supply of water, not from fountains, but from water springs, such as "Ain El Abbasiya". These garrabs were usually from the region of Toudgha.

Some garrabs did not carry goatskins, but jars filled with water, which they sprinkled on the ground in the Souk or near palaces to keep dust and dirt in place. If they broke their jar, they could get a new one from the local religious authorities.

Some scholars mention that Moroccan Jews and Spaniards also practiced tagarrabt, especially for supplying homes.

=== Organization and rituals ===
Garrabs were organized under a regulatory body, managed by a secretary, who ensured order as well as the quality of the water. According to Louis Massignon, tagarrabt was also tied to rituals of sainthood and worship, and garrabs had patron saints in each region who were considered their protectors. In El Jadida, it was Sidi El Mukhfi. In Marrakesh, Sidi Ahmed El Kamel. But probably the most famous patron saint of garrabs in Morocco, was Moulay Yacoub, near Fez. According to Moroccan scholar Mohammed Lakhdar, on a specific day of the year, garrabs would walk from Fez on foot to the shrine of Moulay Yacoub, and would dance and sing for a whole day. The ritual would end by sacrificing an ox, of which they would only eat the forelegs, and the rest would be donated to the poor.

=== Modern times ===
With the development of urban water distribution, tagarrabt became restricted to Souks and public squares. Today, it is a profession on the verge of extinction, mostly maintained by tourism, as an aspect of Moroccan folklore.
