= Waterskin =

Utility vessel made from leather

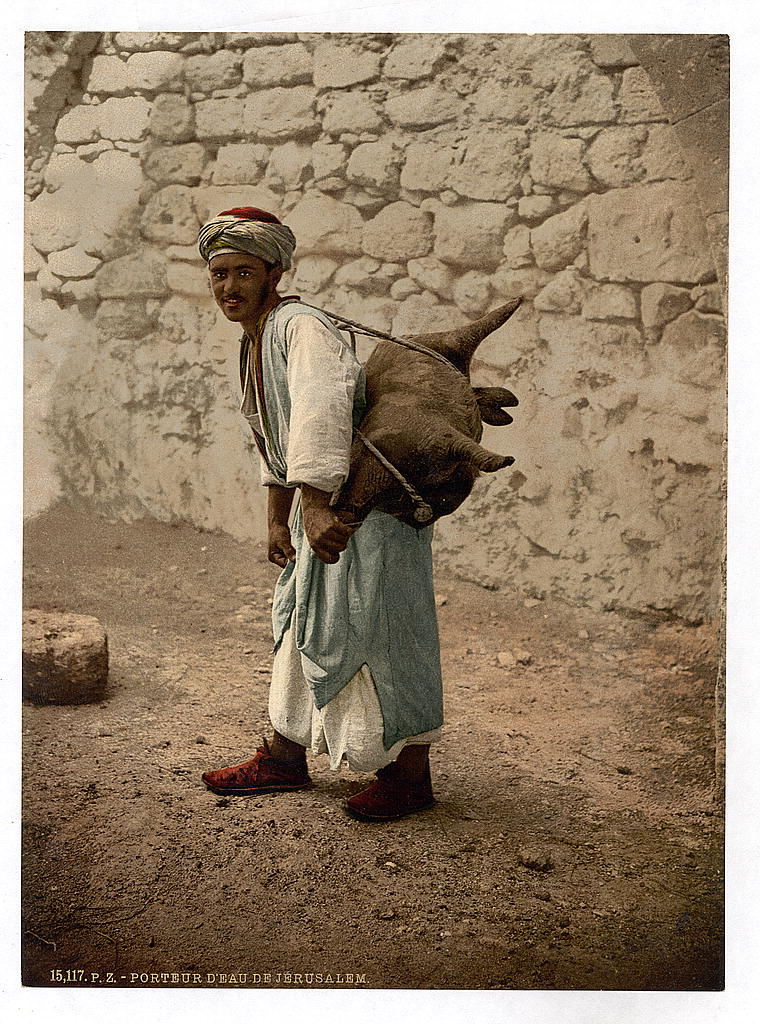
Skin bottle made of goat leather

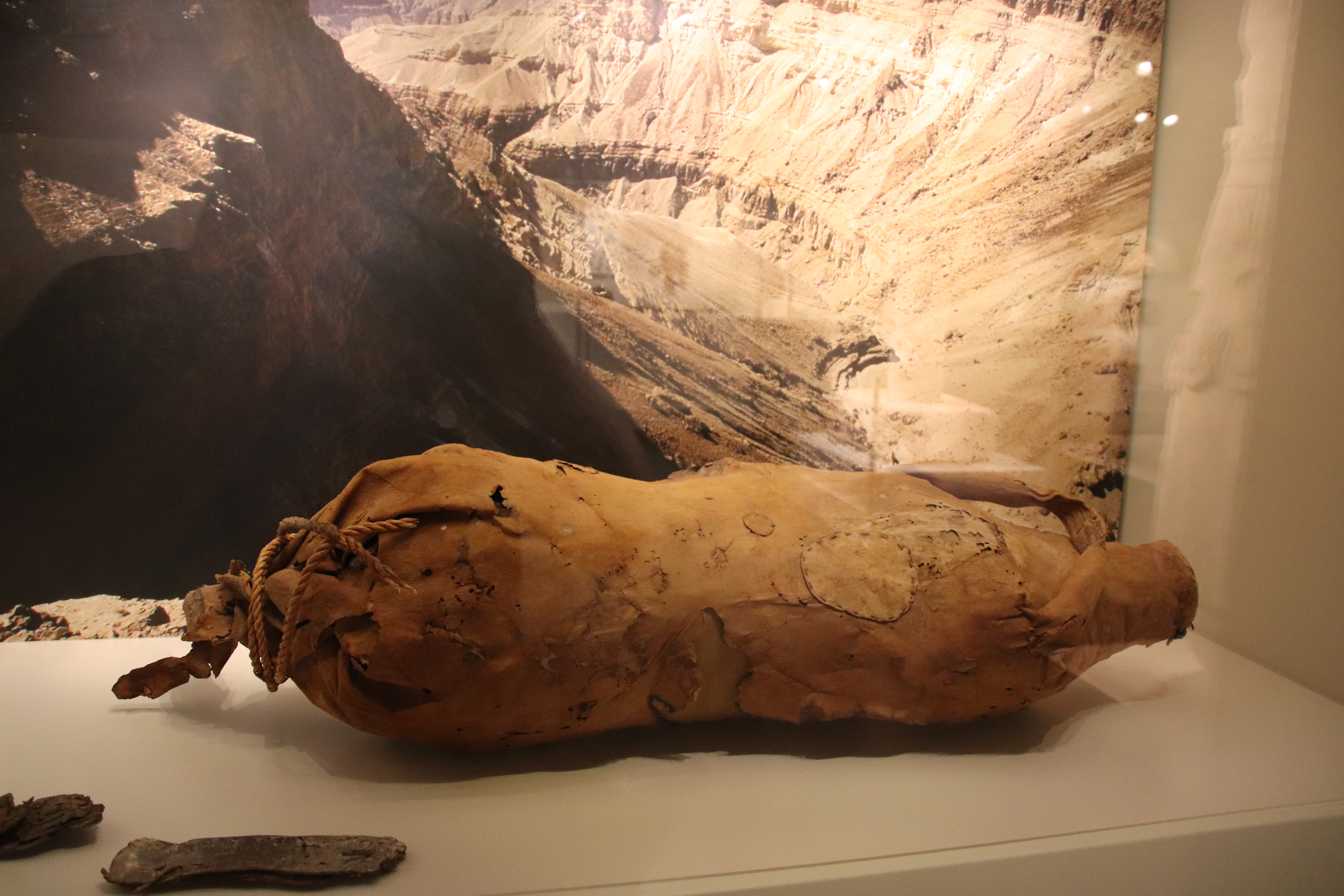
A leather waterskin from the Judean desert, dating back to 132–135 CE.

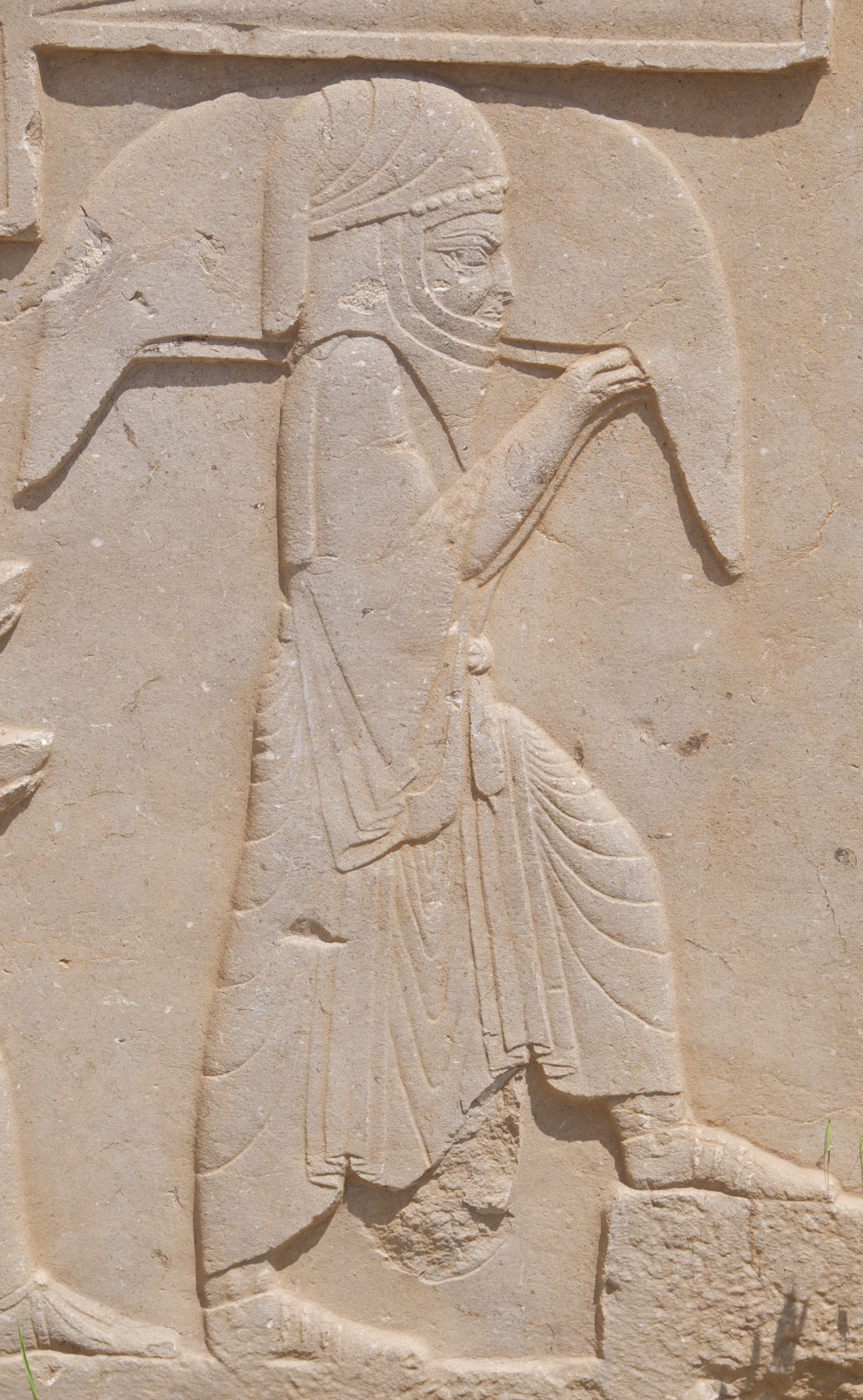
Depiction of a waterskin bearer in Persepolis

A waterskin is a receptacle used to hold water. Normally made of a sheep or goat skin, it retains water naturally and therefore was very useful in desert crossings until the invention of the canteen, though waterskins are still used in some parts of the world. Though it may have been used over 5,000 years ago by tribal peoples, the first pictures of it are from ancient Assyrians, who used the bladders as floats in 3000 BCE. It also was used by large ancient empires such as Rome before the advent of the canteen.

Modern waterskins are often made of various plastic- or rubber-impregnated canvases, or sometimes simply thicker transparent plastics, and are often called water-pouches, water bags, or water bladders. Such modern waterskins offer many features, such as detachable straw-hoses, valves, refill openings of various widths, various closures and handles, styles of covering or cases, and removable cases or carry pouches. A particular style, often called hydration pack, is distinguished by a flexible hose for convenient on-the-go drinking.

== Historical accounts ==
The use of waterskins, or skin-bottles, to transport water is documented in a wide range of historical sources. In the 2nd century CE, the Mishnah (compiled in Judea in 189 CE) mentions their common use among the inhabitants of the land. These skins, after being flayed from the carcass, dressed and prepared to contain liquid, could hold as little as 7 kabs (the equivalent of 168 eggs in volume, or about 9.8 L; 2.6 US gallons; 2.2 imperial gallons), or far more.

Goat skin bottles used to transport water were typically found all throughout the Near East, including the Arabian Peninsula, where, in Yemen, it was common in the 18th century to see a slave carrying a waterskin on his back, or else 3 or 4 waterskins carried by donkey or by camel from the water source. Most waterskins could hold between 18 and 27.5 L (5 and 7 US gallons; 4 and 6 imperial gallons) of water.

The disadvantage of waterskins is that people who have fetched water in the skin bottle, and who have drunk water from the same, have complained of the water taking on the bad taste of the goatskin.

== Uses ==
In some societies, waterskins were used to churn milk into butter, by suspending the skin bottle with ropes between a tripod and two persons moving the waterskin violently back and forth between them. The Tosefta speaks of oil and wine also being stored in skin bottles.

The Bedouins of the Negev would occasionally store clarified butter (samen) and olive-oil in special skins called عُكة (ʿukkah). Their volume would be between 15 and 25 L (4 and 6.5 US gallons; 3.5 and 5.5 imperial gallons).

== Preparation ==
In the Negev, goat-skins were used in making waterskins (القربة = al-girbah), and for making churning bags (السعن = al-siʿin). After flaying the carcass and removing the hairs, the skins were prepared by submerging the goat-skin in a boiled, bath solution containing the bark of either Acacia raddiana or Pistacia atlantica, or else the root of sumac (Rhus tripartita), or the rinds of pomegranates (Punica granatum), and left in that state of immersion for 1 to 3 days.

In Arabic, ʻiṣām (عصام) is the tie of a waterskin, which is bound round the head to confine the contents. It is also the name of the strap that is used for carrying the waterskin; the name of the cord itself.

== See also ==
- Bota bag
- Goatskin (material)
- Colambre
- Wineskin
- Mashk
- CamelBak
- Media related to Waterskin at Wikimedia Commons
