= Émile Chatelain =

French Latinist, palaeographer and librarian (1851–1933)

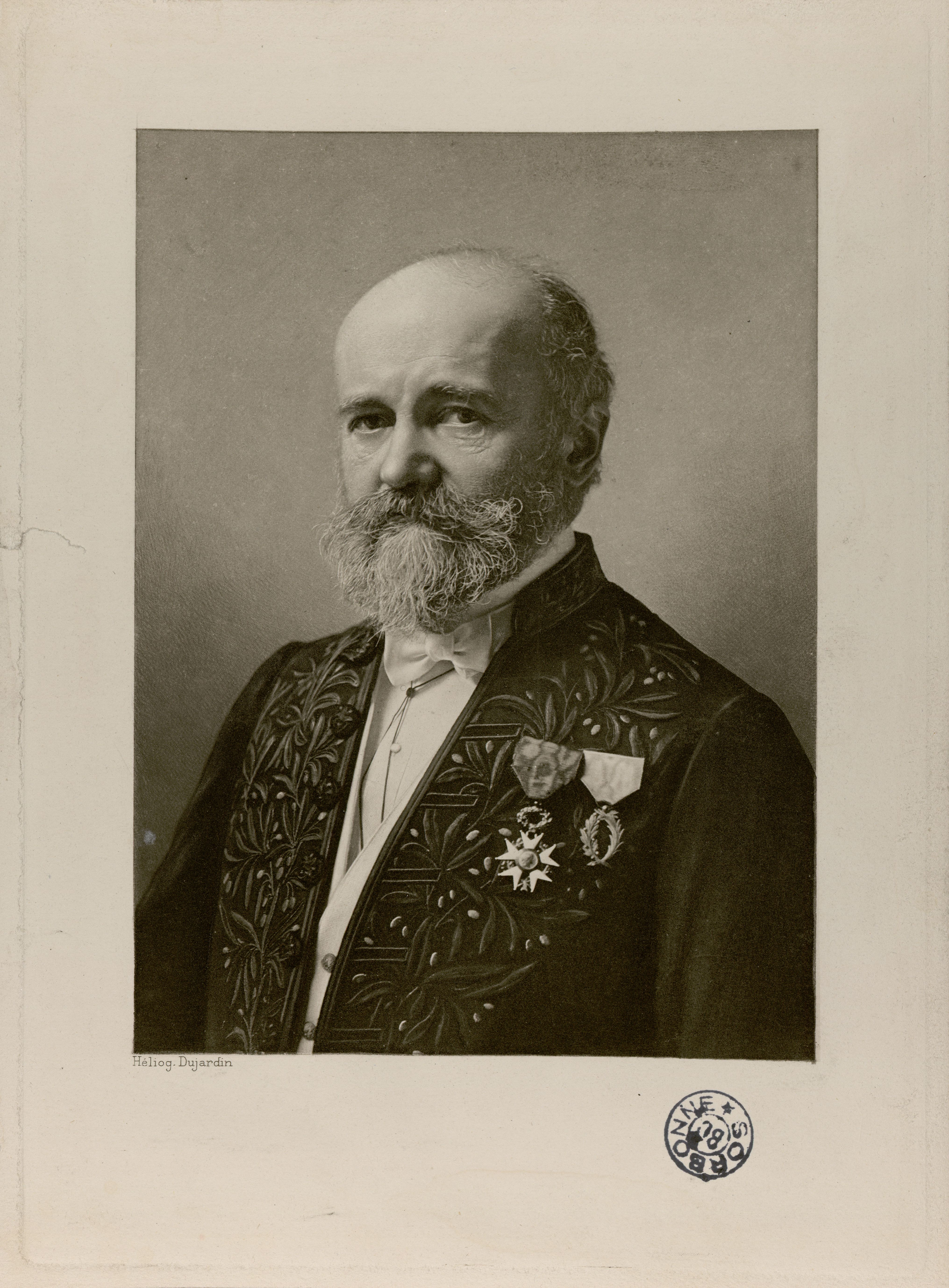
- Born: Émile Louis Marie Chatelain; 25 November 1851; Montrouge
- Died: 26 November 1933 (aged 82); Paris
- Occupations: Latinist; Palaeographer

Émile Chatelain (25 November 1851 – 26 November 1933) was a French Latinist and palaeographer.

== Biography ==
A member of the École française de Rome (1876–1877), collaborator of Henri Denifle for the Chartularium, curator of the Bibliothèque de la Sorbonne, whose catalogs of manuscripts and incunabula he wrote, and study director at the École Pratique des Hautes Études, Émile Chatelain was elected a member of the Académie des Inscriptions et Belles-Lettres in 1903.

He was behind the reissue of the French-Latin dictionary by Quicherat and Daveluy.

Holder of the chair of paleography at the École Pratique des Hautes Études from its origins, he became interested in manuscripts of the late antiquity and the early Middle Ages and especially the best represented writing, the Uncial script and the palimpsests. Under the influence of one of his listeners, Paul Legendre, he devoted considerable research to the use of Tironian notes.

The archaeologist and epigrapher Louis Chatelain was his son.

== Main works ==
His work includes two masterly series of facsimiles:

- Paléographie des classiques latins, Paris, 1884-1887 ;
- Introduction à la lecture des notes tironiennes, Paris, 1900, XVI-234 pages;
- Les palimpsestes latines, "Annuaire de l'École pratique des hautes études", 1904, (p. 5–44);
- Uncialis scriptura codicum Latinorum... Paris, 1901–1922.
