= Canteen (bottle) =

Reusable type of water bottle

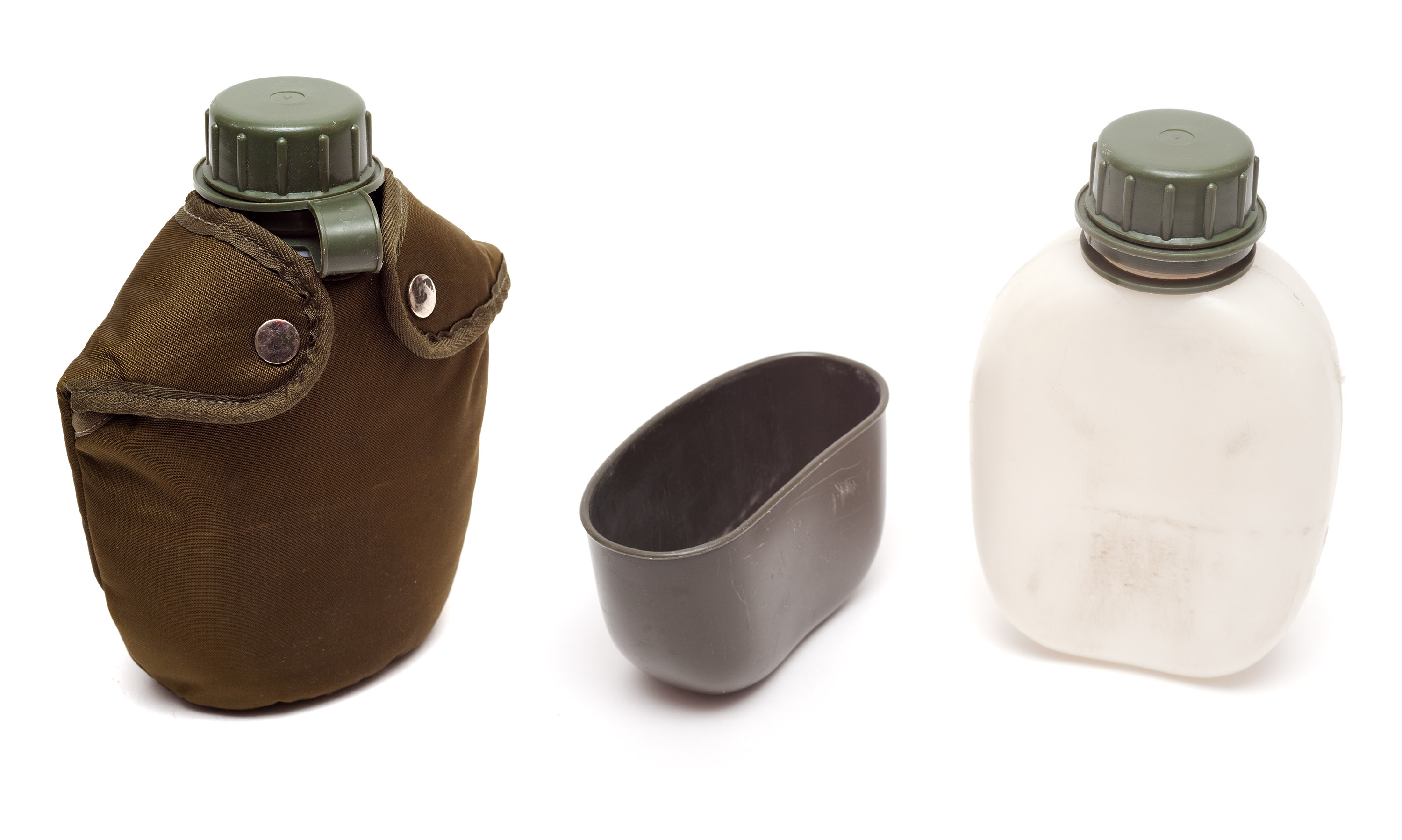
A Norwegian army canteen with plastic cup

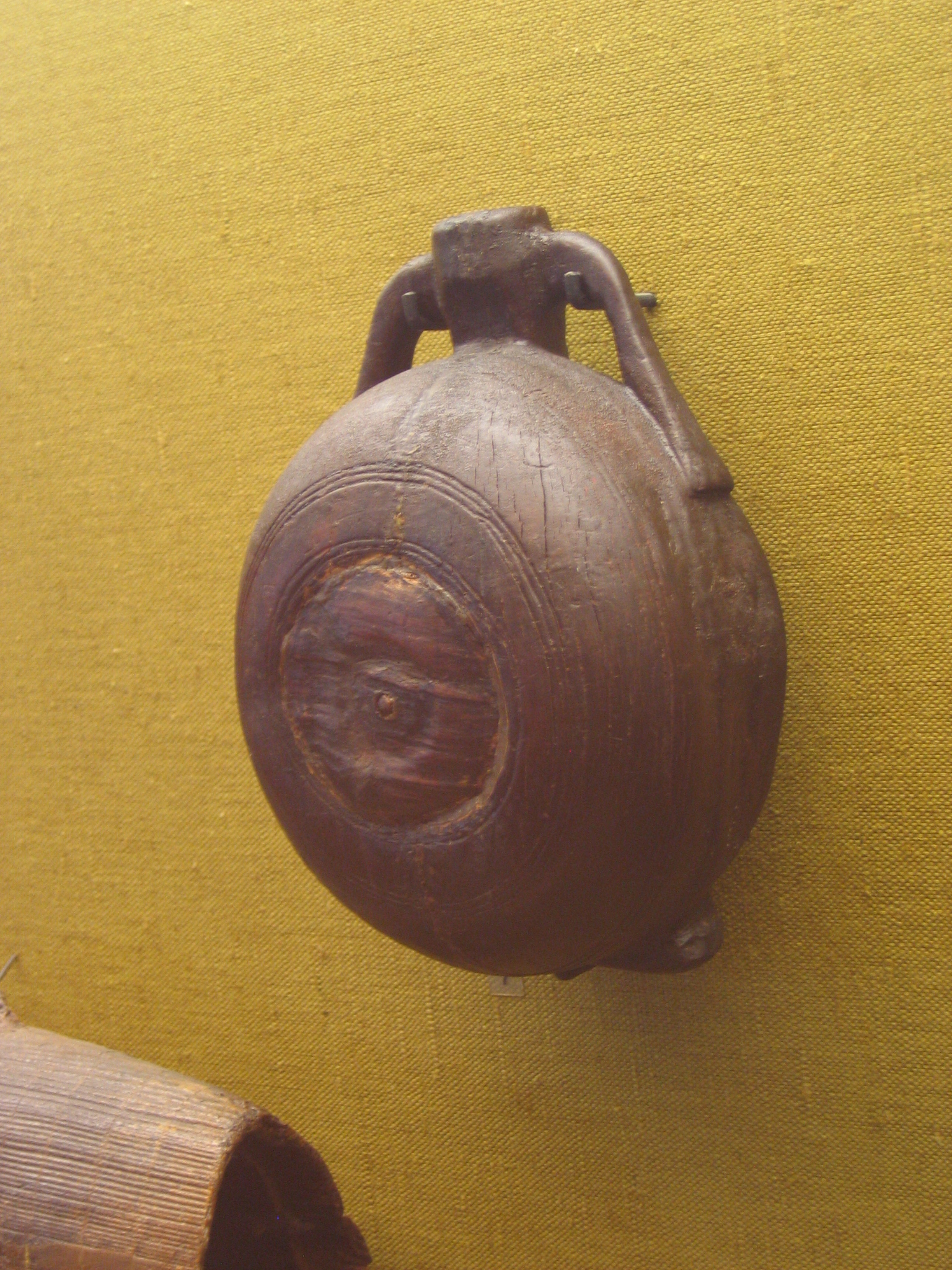
Wooden canteen from Oberflacht, Germany (7th century)

A canteen is a reusable drinking water bottle designed to be used by hikers, campers, soldiers, bush firefighters, and workers in the field. It is usually fitted with a shoulder strap or means for fastening it to a belt, and may be covered with a cloth bag and padding to protect the bottle and insulate the contents. If the padding is soaked with water, evaporative cooling can help keep the contents of the bottle cool. Many canteens also include a nested canteen cup.

Primitive canteens were sometimes made of hollowed-out gourds, such as a calabash, or were bags made of leather.

Later, canteens consisted of a glass bottle in a woven basket cover. The bottle was usually closed with a cork stopper.

Designs of the mid-1900s were made of metal – tin-plated steel, stainless steel or aluminum – with a screw cap, the cap frequently being secured to the bottle neck with a short chain or strap to prevent loosening. These were an improvement over glass bottles, but were subject to developing pinhole leaks if dented, dropped or bumped against jagged rocks.

Contemporary designs are made of plastic (especially polyethylene or polycarbonate), titanium, aluminum or stainless steel. Double-walled metal canteens keep their contents hot or cold. Single-walled metal canteens are generally lighter and have the advantage that they may be placed over an open fire or stove to sterilize water or prepare hot beverages.

Hunter-gatherers in the Kalahari used ostrich eggshells as water containers, puncturing a hole in them to enable them to be used as canteens. The presence of such eggshells dating from the Howiesons Poort period of the Middle Stone Age at Diepkloof Rock Shelter in South Africa suggests canteens were used by humans as early as 60,000 years ago.

== See also ==
- Bota bag
- Camping
- Dromedary Bag
- Hip flask – similar design and function
- Hydration pack
- Nalgene
