= Mišnice =

The mišnice (also mjeršnice) is an instrument like a bagpipe, made from goatskin. Its date of invention is unknown but it is known to have existed in Europe by the 9th century. Different forms of the instrument were found in North Africa and Eastern Europe, especially Croatia, Serbia, Hungary and Ukraine.

It is played by blowing into one pipe while using the fingers to cover or uncover holes in another pipe. It sounds similar to modern bagpipes, but not identical. The chanter, on which the melody is played, is actually a double pipe, with six holes on each side; one set of holes is used as the drone, while the other plays the tune in almost the same register.

The mišnice has been featured in the paintings of Andrea Schiavone.
