= Hip flask =

Flask used to carry alcoholic beverages

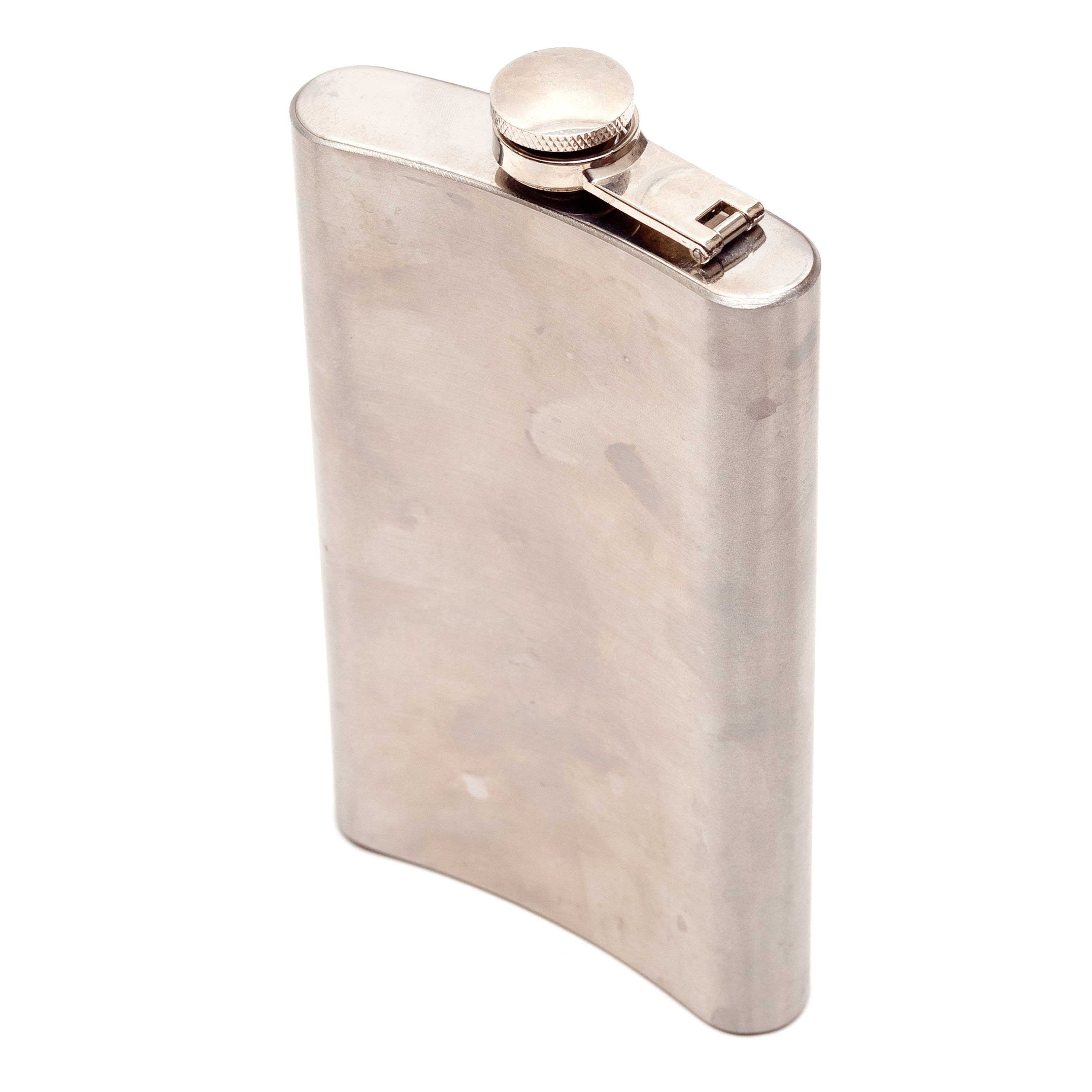
A contoured hip flask with a captive top

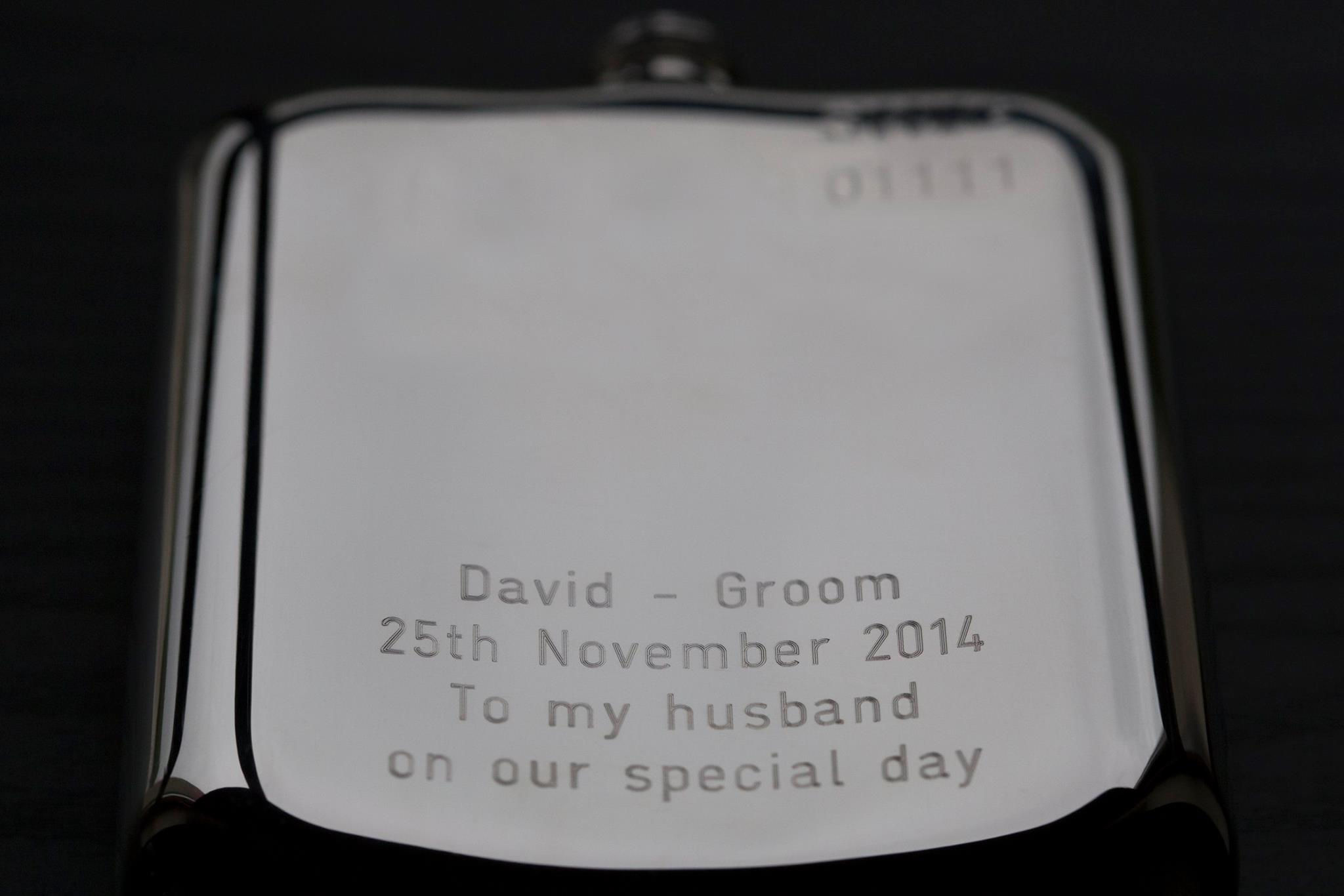
A modern engraved hip flask

A hip flask is a thin flask for holding liquor.

== Description ==
Hip flasks were traditionally made of pewter, silver, or even glass, though most modern flasks are made from stainless steel. Some modern flasks are made of plastic so as to avoid detection by metal detectors.

Hip flasks can vary in shape, although they are usually contoured to match the curve of the wearer's hip or thigh for comfort and discretion in a design also known as a kidney flask. Some flasks have a "captive top", which is a small arm that attaches the top to the flask in order to stop it from getting lost when it is taken off.

A hip flask is most commonly purchased empty and then filled by the owner. However, the term "flask" also applies to smallest bottle sizes of alcohol in commercial markets. Some flasks come with small cups to make sharing easier, although generally liquid is consumed directly from the flask.

== History ==
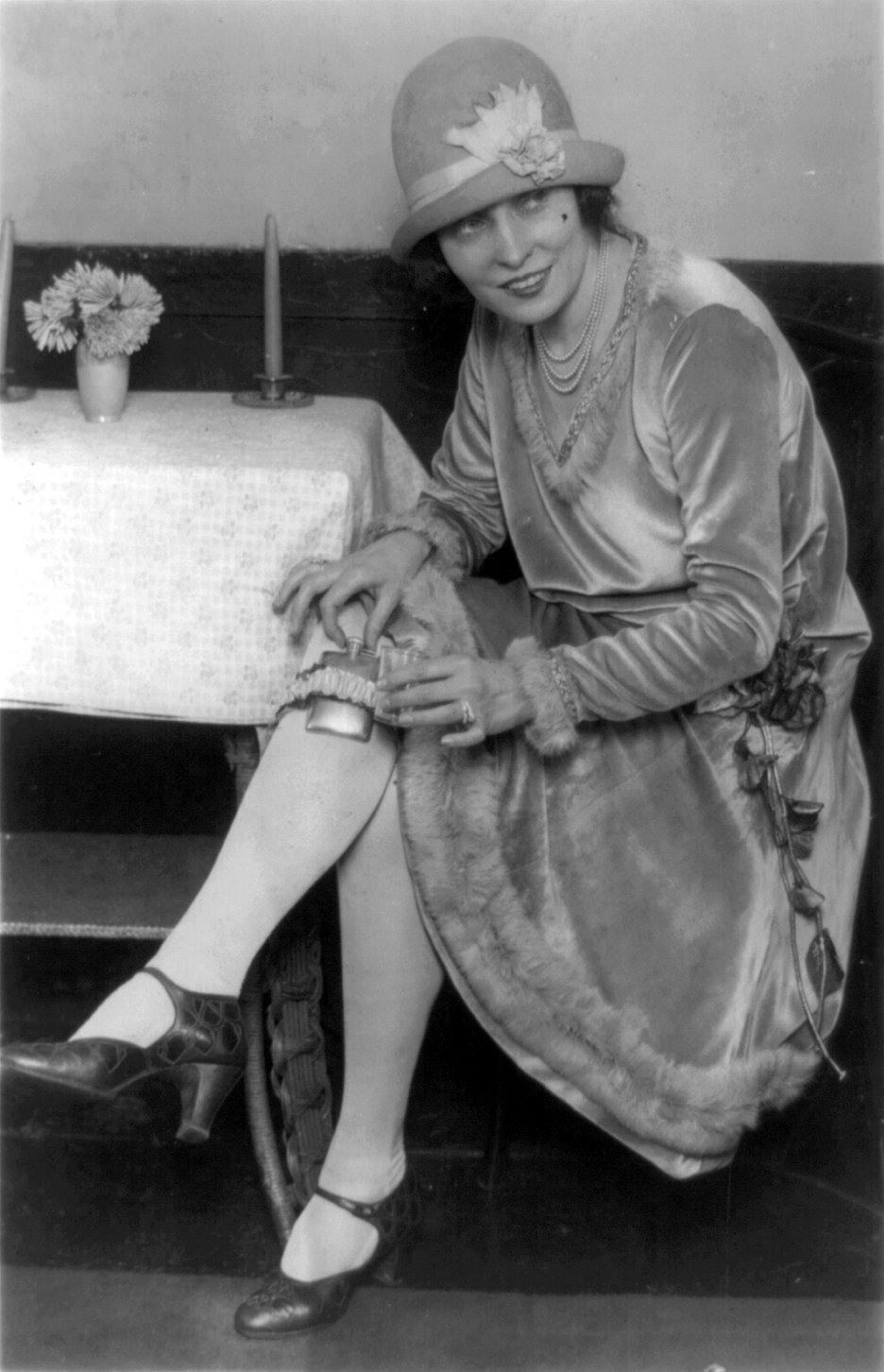
A hip flask is tucked into a garter in 1926, during Prohibition in the United States

The hip flask began to appear in the form it is recognized today in the 18th century, initially used by members of the gentry.

Less compact versions had been in production for several centuries. Notably, in the Middle Ages, there are several accounts of gutted fruit being used to store liquor. During the 18th century, women boarding docked British warships would smuggle gin into the ship via makeshift flasks, created from pig's bladders and hidden inside their petticoats. Following the act of prohibition in 1920s United States, the state of Indiana banned the sale of cocktail shakers and hip flasks.

Antique hip flasks, particularly those made of silver, are now sought-after collector's items.

== Legality ==
Many locations in the United States have laws prohibiting to carrying alcohol in open containers in public, which includes hip flasks, whether carried on one's person or in the passenger cabin or compartment of a vehicle.

In the United Kingdom, carrying or drinking from a hip flask in public places is not illegal in general. Other more specific or local laws & regulations apply regarding drinking in public.

== See also ==
- Canteen—Similar design and function
- One-hitter (smoking)
