= Raymond Thouvenot =

French historian

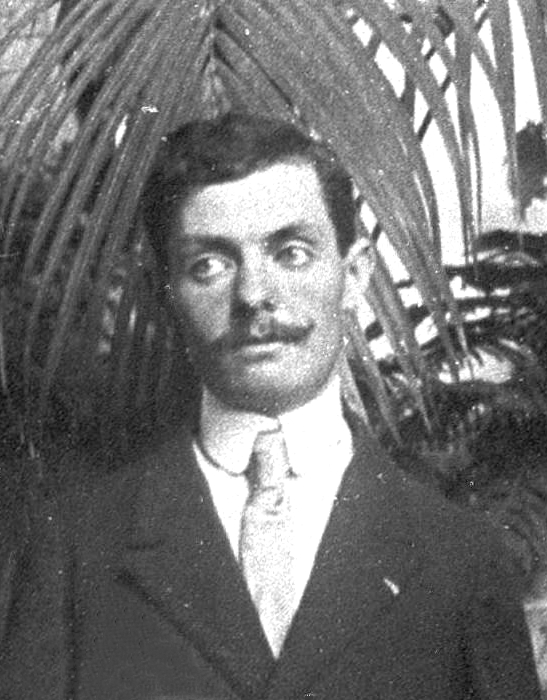
- Born: 15 July 1896; Commercy
- Died: 17 April 1981 (aged 84); Commercy
- Alma mater: École normale supérieure
- Occupation: Archaeologist, university teacher, historian
- Employer: École française de Rome (1919–1920)
- Position held: member of the École française de Rome (1919–1920)

Raymond Thouvenot was a French archaeologist and historian of Roman Antiquity, born on July 15, 1896, in Commercy (Meuse) and died on April 17, 1981, in the same town. He served as director of the Department of Antiquities of Morocco and as professor of ancient history and Roman archaeology at the Faculty of Letters in Poitiers.

== Biography ==
Raymond Thouvenot entered the École normale supérieure in 1916. He was drafted in 1917, wounded in action, and awarded the Croix de Guerre. In 1919, he passed the agrégation in history and geography.

He joined the École française de Rome in 1920, but health issues forced him to interrupt his studies. In 1925, he was appointed to the École des hautes études hispaniques in Madrid (Note: Renamed Casa de Velázquez.) and participated in excavations at Setefilla (Andalusia) and Alcañiz (Aragon).

He later became Inspector of Antiquities in Morocco, and then Director of the Moroccan Department of Antiquities from 1941 (Note: Succeeding Louis Chatelain.) to 1955. He published numerous studies on the Roman city of Volubilis, where he led excavations. He also conducted digs at Banasa and Thamusida. After returning to France, he pursued an academic career at the University of Poitiers, where he was professor of ancient history and Roman archaeology until his retirement in 1967.

== Publications ==
Most of his work focused on the archaeology and ancient history of Spain and Morocco. Key publications include:

- Essai sur la province romaine de Bétique, Paris, De Boccard, 1940 (748 pp.); 2nd ed., 1973 (Doctoral thesis)
- Une colonie romaine de Maurétanie Tingitane: Valentia Banasa, Paris, PUF, 1941 (Complementary thesis)
- Volubilis, Paris, Les Belles Lettres, 1949
- L’urbanisme romain dans le Maroc antique, Madrid, Editorial de la Universidad Complutense de Madrid, 1979 (349 pp.)

Later in life, he also published small monographs about his native region.

== Honors ==
- Croix de guerre 1914–1918
