= Gurab-e Olya =

Gurab-e Olya (Persian: گورابعليا) may refer to:

- Gurab-e Olya, Dehloran
- Gurab-e Olya, Shirvan and Chardaval
