= Gurab-e Rostam =

Gurab-e Rostam گوراب رستم
- Village
- Location within Iran
- Coordinates: 30°15′32″N 51°30′28″E
- Country: Iran
- Province: Fars
- County: Rostam
- Bakhsh: Central
- Rural District: Rostam-e Yek

Population (2006)
  - Total: 197
- Time zone: UTC+3:30 (IRST)
  - Summer (DST): UTC+4:30 (IRDT)

Gurab-e Rostam (Persian: گوراب رستم, also Romanized as Gūrāb-e Rostam; also known as Gūrāb) is a village in Rostam-e Yek Rural District, in the Central District of Rostam County, Fars province, Iran. At the 2006 census, its population was 197, in 34 families.
