= Bota bag =

Traditional Spanish liquid receptacle

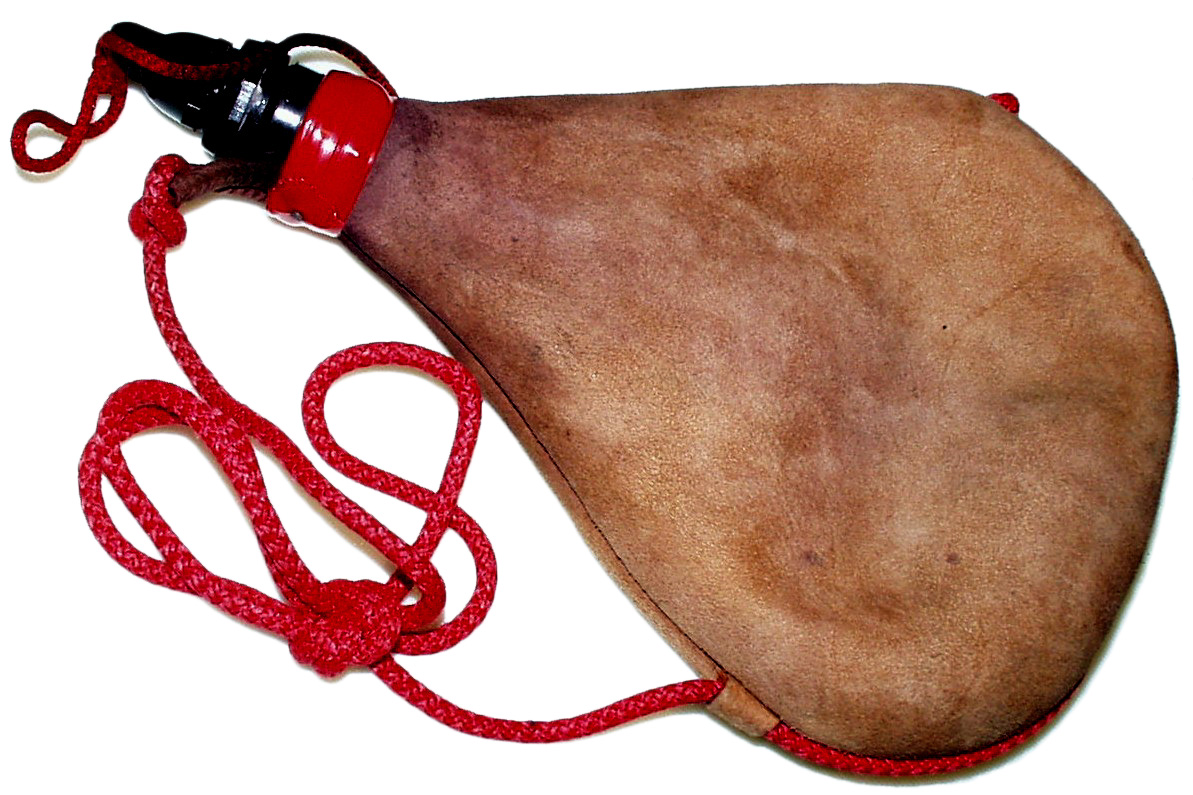
A bota bag

A bota bag is a traditional Spanish liquid receptacle, used mainly as a wineskin. It is often made out of leather (when made of goatskin it is simply known as a goatskin), and is typically used to carry wine, although any liquid can be filled into it.

== Construction ==
Traditionally, bota bags were lined with goat bladders, in other cases tree sap or other resins were used to prevent liquids from seeping through. Modern bota bags have a plastic liner and nozzle.

== Variants ==
The zahato [s̻ahato] is the traditional goatskin bottle of the Basque shepherds. With its narrow nozzle, it is possible to drink "zurrust", i.e. intercepting the jet without touching the bottle. The name of zahato or zahako (variants: xahako [ʃahako], zarako) is a diminutive zahat-to/-ko of zahagi 'big goatskin bottle'. Its manufacturer is a zahatogile.

The zahato is made of two pieces of tanned and close-cropped goatskin. Softened, they are cut out on a last and are sewn on their sides. Then the bottle is turned up, seam and hair inside. After drying, it is inflated, then coated with pitch to make it impermeable. The nozzle, traditionally in horn, is fixed by a red collar. The zahato is carried across the shoulder with the red cord which surrounds it along the seam.

== See also ==
- Box wine
- Canteen (bottle)
- Colambre
- Goatskin (material)
- Mashk
- New Wine into Old Wineskins
- Waterskin
