= Garab, Ilam =

Village in Ilam, Iran

Garab گراب
- Village
- Location within Iran
- Coordinates: 33°41′56″N 47°01′15″E
- Country: Iran
- Province: Ilam
- County: Chardavol
- Bakhsh: Helilan
- Rural District: Helilan

Population (2006)
  - Total: 98
- Time zone: UTC+3:30 (IRST)
  - Summer (DST): UTC+4:30 (IRDT)

Garab (Persian: گراب, also Romanized as Garāb) is a village in Helilan Rural District, Helilan District, Chardavol County, Ilam Province, Iran. At the 2006 census, its population was 98, in 20 families. The village is populated by Kurds.
