= Garab, Sabzevar =

Garab گراب
- Village
- Location within Iran
- Coordinates: 35°32′23″N 57°20′38″E
- Country: Iran
- Province: Razavi Khorasan
- County: Sabzevar
- Bakhsh: Rud Ab
- Rural District: Khavashod

Population (2006)
  - Total: 68
- Time zone: UTC+3:30 (IRST)
  - Summer (DST): UTC+4:30 (IRDT)

Garab (Persian: گراب, also Romanized as Garāb and Gar Āb) is a village in Khavashod Rural District, Rud Ab District, Sabzevar County, Razavi Khorasan Province, Iran. At the 2006 census, its population was 68, in 21 families.
