= Gurab-e Sofla =

Gurab-e Sofla (Persian: گورابسفلي), also known as Gurab-e Pain, may refer to:

- Gurab-e Sofla, Dehloran, Ilam Province
- Gurab-e Sofla, Shirvan and Chardaval, Ilam Province
