= Gurab-e Jomeh =

Gurab-e Jomeh گوراب جمعه
- Village
- Location within Iran
- Coordinates: 31°05′33″N 56°31′31″E
- Country: Iran
- Province: Kerman
- County: Zarand
- Bakhsh: Central
- Rural District: Dasht-e Khak

Population (2006)
  - Total: 66
- Time zone: UTC+3:30 (IRST)
  - Summer (DST): UTC+4:30 (IRDT)

Gurab-e Jomeh (Persian: گوراب جمعه, also Romanized as Gūrāb-e Jom‘eh; also known as Gūrāb-e Balūchhā) is a village in Dasht-e Khak Rural District, in the Central District of Zarand County, Kerman Province, Iran. At the 2006 census, its population was 66, in 17 families.
