= Wineskin =

Container made out of animal skin

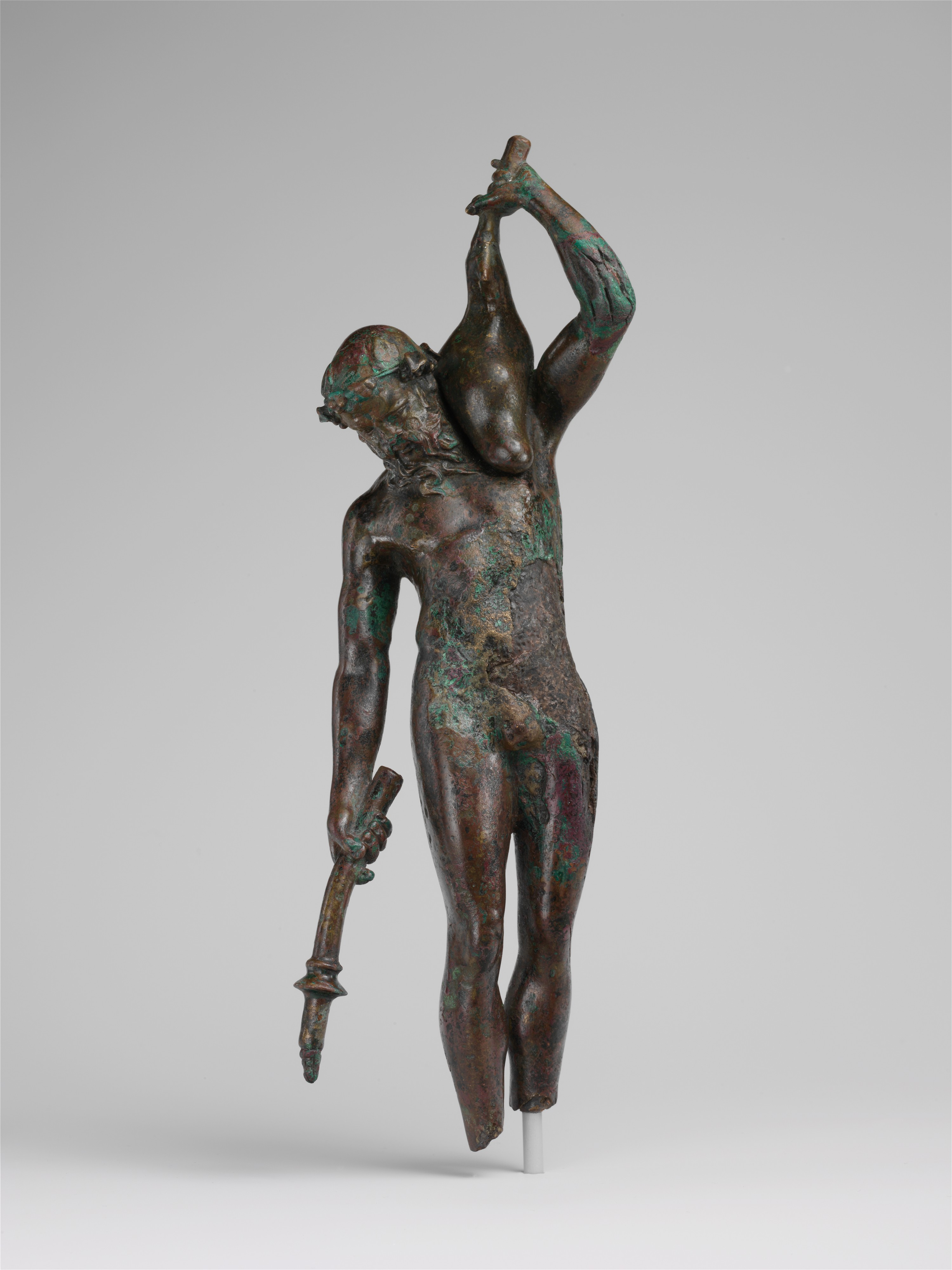
Statue of a satyr including a torch and a wineskin from 3rd–2nd century B.C

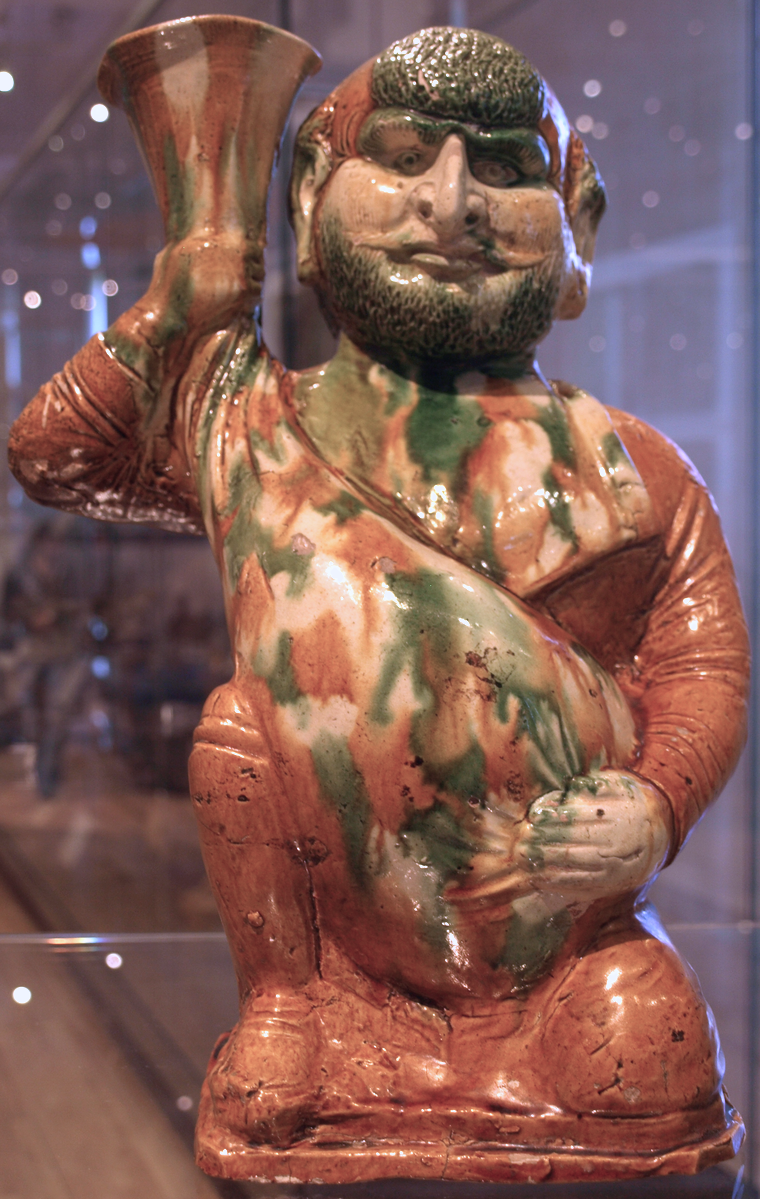
Tang tricolor figurine of a Sogdian wine merchant holding a wineskin. During the Tang dynasty (618–907), China started to import grape wine from Central Asia.

A wineskin is an ancient type of bottle made of leathered animal skin, usually from goats or sheep, used to store or transport wine.

== History ==
Its first mentions come from Ancient Greece, where, in parties called Bacchanalia, dedicated to the god Bacchus by the vintage of this drink, the sacrifice of the goat was offered, following which the wineskin could be made that would conserve the wine.

New Wine into Old Wineskins is a parable of Jesus.

== See also ==
- Ancient Greece and wine
- Bota bag
- Waterskin
- Mashk
