= Gurab, Andika =

Gurab گوراب
- Village
- Location within Iran
- Coordinates: 32°21′12″N 49°52′51″E
- Country: Iran
- Province: Khuzestan
- County: Andika
- Bakhsh: Chelo
- Rural District: Chelo

Population (2006)
  - Total: 28
- Time zone: UTC+3:30 (IRST)
  - Summer (DST): UTC+4:30 (IRDT)

Gurab (Persian: گوراب, also Romanized as Gūrāb; also known as Gorrāb) is a village in Chelo Rural District, Chelo District, Andika County, Khuzestan Province, Iran. At the 2006 census, its population was 28, in 5 families.
