= Louis Chatelain =

French historian, archaeologist and university professor

- Born: Émile Louis Marie Chatelain; 25 February 1883; Paris
- Died: 6 October 1950 (aged 67); Paris
- Occupation(s): Historian; Archaeologist

Louis Chatelain (23 February 1883 – 6 October 1950) was a 20th-century French historian, archaeologist and university professor. The son of Émile Chatelain, philologist and Latinist, he particularly worked on the excavation sites of Orange, Maktar (Tunisia) and Volubilis (Morocco).

== Education ==
- A student of the École pratique des hautes études in the historical and philological sciences department, he defended a thesis entitled Les monuments romains d'Orange in 1908.
- A member of the École française de Rome (1908–1911), his memoir then was devoted to the Makthar site.

== Works ==
Besides his work on Orange and Makthar, most of his activity focused on Morocco's classical archaeology in general and in particular Volubilis.

During World War II, after being wounded, he was assigned to Volubilis where he had the site cleared by German prisoners of war and French soldiers.

In 1918, he was appointed director of the department of antiquities of Morocco. He played a role in the creation of the Rabat Archaeological Museum in 1928. A teacher in Morocco until 1941, he was later appointed to Rennes. In 1943, he supported a thesis entitled Le Maroc des Romains.

== Publications (selection) ==
In addition to numerous articles:

- 1908: Les monuments romains d'Orange
- 1916: Les Fouilles de Volubilis (Ksar-Faraoun, Maroc)
- 1923: Inscriptions latines d'Afrique (Tripolitaine, Tunisie, Maroc), with René Cagnat and Alfred Merlin
- 1942: Inscriptions latines du Maroc
- 1944: Le Maroc des Romains: étude sur les centres antiques de la Maurétanie occidentale
- 1949: Le Maroc des Romains: Album d'illustrations

== Bibliography ==
- Véronique Brouquier-Reddé, Institut national des sciences de l'archéologie et du patrimoine (Maroc) and René Rebuffat: Louis Chatelain (1883-1950): biographie et bibliographie. Institut national des sciences de l'archéologie et du patrimoine, 2004.
