= Gurab, Izeh =

Gurab گوراب
- Village
- Location within Iran
- Coordinates: 31°44′43″N 49°51′01″E
- Country: Iran
- Province: Khuzestan Province
- County: Izeh County
- District: Central District
- Rural District: Holayjan Rural District

Population (2006)
  - Total: 283
- Time zone: UTC+3:30 (IRST)
  - Summer (DST): UTC+4:30 (IRDT)

Gurab (Persian: گوراب, also Romanized as Gūrāb; also known as Gūrāb-e Nāshelīl) is a village in Holayjan Rural District, Central District, Izeh County, Khuzestan Province, Iran.

The village is located in the southwestern part of Iran, within Khuzestan Province, and is administratively part of Izeh County. Gurab is one of the settlements of Holayjan Rural District, which is governed under the Central District of Izeh County.

According to the 2006 Iranian census, Gurab had a population of 283 people in 52 families. The census recorded the population figures as part of the official statistical data collected by the Statistical Centre of Iran.

== See also ==
- List of villages in Khuzestan Province
- Izeh County
