= Garmab, Markazi =

Garmab گرماب
- Village
- Location within Iran
- Coordinates: 34°23′44″N 49°03′30″E
- Country: Iran
- Province: Markazi
- County: Khondab
- Bakhsh: Central
- Rural District: Deh Chal

Population (2006)
  - Total: 404
- Time zone: UTC+3:30 (IRST)
  - Summer (DST): UTC+4:30 (IRDT)

Garmab (Persian: گرماب, also Romanized as Garmāb) is a village in Deh Chal Rural District, in the Central District of Khondab County, Markazi Province, Iran. At the 2006 census, its population was 404, in 106 families.
