= Garmab-e Olya =

Garmab-e Olya گرماب عليا
- Village
- Location within Iran
- Coordinates: 36°01′49″N 45°22′15″E
- Country: Iran
- Province: West Azerbaijan
- County: Sardasht
- Bakhsh: Central
- Rural District: Alan

Population (2006)
  - Total: 13
- Time zone: UTC+3:30 (IRST)
  - Summer (DST): UTC+4:30 (IRDT)

Garmab-e Olya (Persian: گرماب عليا, also Romanized as Garmāb-e ‘Olyā; also known as Garmāb-e Bālā) is a village in Alan Rural District, in the Central District of Sardasht County, West Azerbaijan Province, Iran. At the 2006 census, its population was 13, in 5 families.
