= Garmab Dasht =

Garmab Dasht گرمابدشت
- Village
- Location within Iran
- Coordinates: 36°52′23″N 50°13′40″E
- Country: Iran
- Province: Gilan
- County: Rudsar
- Bakhsh: Rahimabad
- Rural District: Eshkevar-e Sofla

Population (2006)
  - Total: 51
- Time zone: UTC+3:30 (IRST)
  - Summer (DST): UTC+4:30 (IRDT)

Garmab Dasht (Persian: گرمابدشت, also Romanized as Garmāb Dasht) is a village in Eshkevar-e Sofla Rural District, Rahimabad District, Rudsar County, Gilan Province, Iran. At the 2006 census, its population was 51, in 21 families.
