= Garmab-e Shahzadeh =

Garmab-e Shahzadeh گرماب شاهزاده
- Village
- Location within Iran
- Coordinates: 36°31′42″N 58°16′53″E
- Country: Iran
- Province: Razavi Khorasan
- County: Firuzeh
- Bakhsh: Taghenkoh
- Rural District: Taghenkoh-e Shomali

Population (2006)
  - Total: 287
- Time zone: UTC+3:30 (IRST)
  - Summer (DST): UTC+4:30 (IRDT)

Garmab-e Shahzadeh (Persian: گرماب شاهزاده, also Romanized as Garmāb-e Shāhzādeh; also known as Garmāb) is a village in Taghenkoh-e Shomali Rural District, Taghenkoh District, Firuzeh County, Razavi Khorasan Province, Iran. At the 2006 census, its population was 287, in 68 families.
