= Gurab, Kohgiluyeh =

Gurab گوراب
- Village
- Location within Iran
- Coordinates: 31°04′08″N 50°32′48″E
- Country: Iran
- Province: Kohgiluyeh and Boyer-Ahmad
- County: Kohgiluyeh
- Bakhsh: Charusa
- Rural District: Tayebi-ye Sarhadi-ye Sharqi

Population (2006)
  - Total: 163
- Time zone: UTC+3:30 (IRST)
  - Summer (DST): UTC+4:30 (IRDT)

Gurab (Persian: گوراب, also Romanized as Gūrāb; also known as Gerdāb) is a village in Iran. It is located within Tayebi-ye Sarhadi-ye Sharqi Rural District, Charusa District, Kohgiluyeh County, in Kohgiluyeh and Boyer-Ahmad Province. At the 2006 census, its population was 163, in 34 families.
