= Garmab, Kamyaran =

Garmab گرم آب
- Village
- Location within Iran
- Coordinates: 34°49′24″N 47°02′13″E
- Country: Iran
- Province: Kurdistan
- County: Kamyaran
- Bakhsh: Central
- Rural District: Bilavar

Population (2006)
  - Total: 20
- Time zone: UTC+3:30 (IRST)
  - Summer (DST): UTC+4:30 (IRDT)

Garmab (Persian: گرم آب, also Romanized as Garmāb) is a village in Bilavar Rural District, in the Central District of Kamyaran County, Kurdistan Province, Iran. At the 2006 census, its population was 20, in 5 families. The village is populated by Kurds.
