= Gurab-e Lishavandan =

Village in Gilan province, Iran

Gurab-e Lishavandan Persian: گوراب ليشاوندان
- Village
- Location within Iran
- Coordinates: 37°16′09″N 49°25′33″E
- Country: Iran
- Province: Gilan
- County: Shaft
- District: Central
- Rural District: Molla Sara

Population (2016)
  - Total: 1,250
- Time zone: UTC+3:30 (IRST)

Gurab-e Lishavandan (Persian: گوراب ليشاوندان) (Note: Also romanized as Gūrāb-e Līshāvandān; also known as Gūrāb-e Lashāvandān) is a village in Molla Sara Rural District of the Central District in Shaft County, Gilan province, Iran.

== Demographics ==
=== Population ===
At the time of the 2006 National Census, the village's population was 1,303 in 344 households. The following census in 2011 counted 1,284 people in 393 households. The 2016 census measured the population of the village as 1,250 people in 421 households.
