= Gurab Dagchi =

Gurab Dagchi گوراب دگچي
- Village
- Country: Iran
- Province: Khuzestan
- County: Andika
- Bakhsh: Chelo
- Rural District: Chelo

Population (2006)
  - Total: 89
- Time zone: UTC+3:30 (IRST)
  - Summer (DST): UTC+4:30 (IRDT)

Gurab Dagchi (Persian: گوراب دگچي, also Romanized as Gūrāb Dagchī; also known as Dagchī) is a village in Chelo Rural District, Chelo District, Andika County, Khuzestan Province, Iran. At the 2006 census, its population was 89, in 18 families.
