= Gar Ab, Hormozgan =

Gar Ab گراب
- Village
- Location within Iran
- Coordinates: 27°12′45″N 57°21′42″E
- Country: Iran
- Province: Hormozgan
- County: Rudan
- Bakhsh: Jaghin
- Rural District: Jaghin-e Shomali

Population (2006)
  - Total: 470
- Time zone: UTC+3:30 (IRST)
  - Summer (DST): UTC+4:30 (IRDT)

Gar Ab (Persian: گراب, also Romanized as Gar Āb) is a village in Jaghin-e Shomali Rural District, Jaghin District, Rudan County, Hormozgan Province, Iran. At the 2006 census, its population was 470, in 87 families.
