= Gurab, Susan =

Gurab گوراب
- Village
- Location within Iran
- Coordinates: 32°01′06″N 49°56′04″E
- Country: Iran
- Province: Khuzestan
- County: Izeh
- Bakhsh: Susan
- Rural District: Susan-e Gharbi

Population (2006)
  - Total: 414
- Time zone: UTC+3:30 (IRST)
  - Summer (DST): UTC+4:30 (IRDT)

Gurab (Persian: گوراب, also Romanized as Gūrāb) is a village in Susan-e Gharbi Rural District, Susan District, Izeh County, Khuzestan Province, Iran. At the 2006 census, its population was 414, in 63 families.
