= Garm Ab, Afghanistan =

Garm Ab
- Location in Afghanistan
- Coordinates: 33°58′3″N 67°27′41″E
- Country: Afghanistan
- Province: Bamyan Province
- Time zone: + 4.30

Garm Ab is a village in Bamyan Province in central Afghanistan.

== See also ==
- Bamyan Province
