= Garmab, Kermanshah =

Garmab گرماب
- Village
- Location within Iran
- Coordinates: 34°34′50″N 47°10′39″E
- Country: Iran
- Province: Kermanshah
- County: Sahneh
- Bakhsh: Dinavar
- Rural District: Kanduleh

Population (2006)
  - Total: 116
- Time zone: UTC+3:30 (IRST)
  - Summer (DST): UTC+4:30 (IRDT)

Garmab (Persian: گرماب, also Romanized as Garmāb and Garm Āb) is a village in Kanduleh Rural District, Dinavar District, Sahneh County, Kermanshah Province, Iran. At the 2006 census, its population was 116, in 24 families.
