= Gurab-e Sorkh =

Gurab-e Sorkh گوراب سرخ
- Village
- Location within Iran
- Coordinates: 32°21′25″N 49°03′09″E
- Country: Iran
- Province: Khuzestan
- County: Lali
- Bakhsh: Central
- Rural District: Dasht-e Lali

Population (2006)
  - Total: 84
- Time zone: UTC+3:30 (IRST)
  - Summer (DST): UTC+4:30 (IRDT)

Gurab-e Sorkh (Persian: گوراب سرخ, also Romanized as Gūrāb-e Sorkh) is a village in Dasht-e Lali Rural District, in the Central District of Lali County, Khuzestan Province, Iran. At the 2006 census, its population was 84, with 15 families.
