= Garab-e Olya, Kohgiluyeh and Boyer-Ahmad =

Garab-e Olya گراب عليا
- Village
- Location within Iran
- Coordinates: 30°56′30″N 50°53′52″E
- Country: Iran
- Province: Kohgiluyeh and Boyer-Ahmad
- County: Boyer-Ahmad
- Bakhsh: Ludab
- Rural District: Ludab

Population (2006)
  - Total: 38
- Time zone: UTC+3:30 (IRST)
  - Summer (DST): UTC+4:30 (IRDT)

Garab-e Olya (Persian: گراب عليا, also Romanized as Garāb-e ‘Olyā; also known as Garāb-e Bālā) is a village in Ludab Rural District, Ludab District, Boyer-Ahmad County, Kohgiluyeh and Boyer-Ahmad Province, Iran. At the 2006 census, its population was 38, in 8 families.
