= Colambre =

Wineskin

A colambre is a wineskin whose origin comes from the 16th century. In Spanish it is known as "bota", a word used by Miguel de Cervantes in his early 17th century novel Don Quixote.
