= Mashk =

Traditional water-carrying bag from North India, Pakistan and Nepal

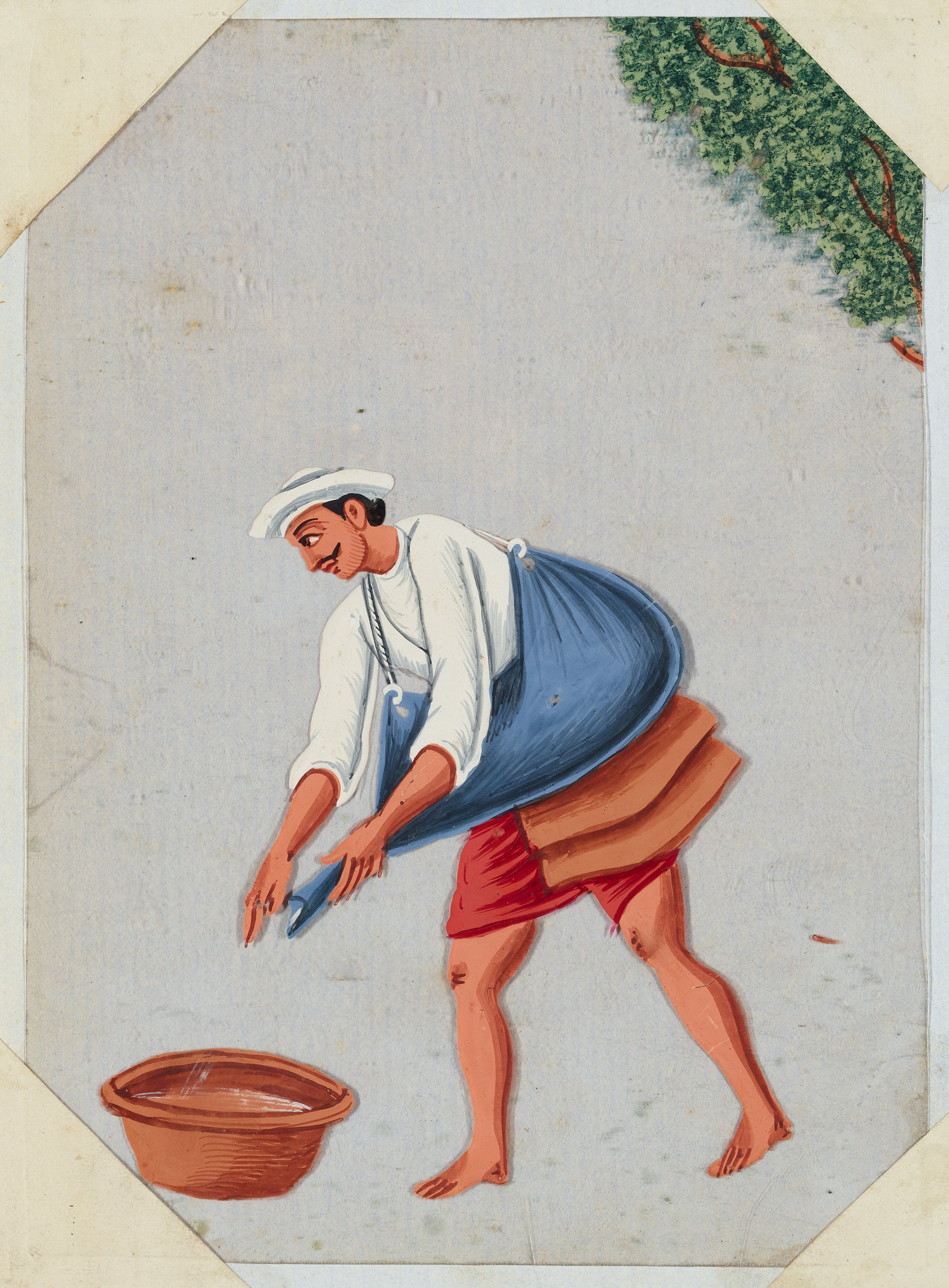
The painting of a Water Carrier using Mashq, India, 1836.

A mashk or mashq (Hindi: मश्क, Urdu: مَشْکَ; ISO: Maśka) is a traditional water-carrying bag, usually made of waterproofed goat-skin, from North India, Pakistan and Nepal.

Mashqs can vary in size, from a hand-held bag to a large sized bag that comes with shoulder strap, usually having only one narrowed opening. The mashq was often used to carry liquids such as water and alcohol.

A person who is carrying a large mashk is called a māshqi (माश्की, ماشْکِی). Traditionally, in the northern part of the South Asia, the larger mashq was associated with the Bhishti (भिश्ती, بهِشْتِی) subcaste who were employed as water-carriers by all other sections of society and often seen dispensing water (for a fee) in public places, gardens and construction sites.

Since water came as a great relief to people and plants during the hot summer in the northern Indian plains, the term Bhishti derives from the Persian root word bahishti, meaning heavenly.

== See also ==
- Bhishti
- Bota bag
- Goatskin (material)
- Matki (earthen pot)
- Ring sling
- Head-carrying
- Tumpline
