= Garab-e Olya, Khuzestan =

Garab-e Olya گراب عليا
- Village
- Location within Iran
- Coordinates: 30°45′28″N 50°11′54″E
- Country: Iran
- Province: Khuzestan
- County: Behbahan
- Bakhsh: Central
- Rural District: Dodangeh

Population (2006)
  - Total: 224
- Time zone: UTC+3:30 (IRST)
  - Summer (DST): UTC+4:30 (IRDT)

Garab-e Olya (Persian: گراب عليا, also Romanized as Garāb-e ‘Olyā; also known as Garāb) is a village in Dodangeh Rural District, in the Central District of Behbahan County, Khuzestan Province, Iran. At the 2006 census, its population was 224, in 41 families.
