= Garrab-e Olya, Kermanshah =

Garrab-e Olya گراب عليا
- Village
- Location within Iran
- Coordinates: 34°43′07″N 46°33′04″E
- Country: Iran
- Province: Kermanshah
- County: Ravansar
- Bakhsh: Central
- Rural District: Dowlatabad

Population (2006)
  - Total: 168
- Time zone: UTC+3:30 (IRST)
  - Summer (DST): UTC+4:30 (IRDT)

Garrab-e Olya (Persian: گراب عليا, also Romanized as Garrāb-e ‘Olyā and Garāb-e ‘Olyā) is a village in Dowlatabad Rural District, in the Central District of Ravansar County, Kermanshah Province, Iran. At the 2006 census, its population was 168, in 41 families.
