= Garab, Khuzestan =

Garab گراب
- Village
- Location within Iran
- Coordinates: 32°00′31″N 48°56′31″E
- Country: Iran
- Province: Khuzestan
- County: Shushtar
- Bakhsh: Central
- Rural District: Shahid Modarres

Population (2006)
  - Total: 189
- Time zone: UTC+3:30 (IRST)
  - Summer (DST): UTC+4:30 (IRDT)

Garab (Persian: گراب, also Romanized as Garāb and Garrāb; also known as Garmāb) is a village in Shahid Modarres Rural District, in the Central District of Shushtar County, Khuzestan Province, Iran. At the 2006 census, its population was 189, in 38 families.
