= Goatskin (material) =

Furreds skin of a goat

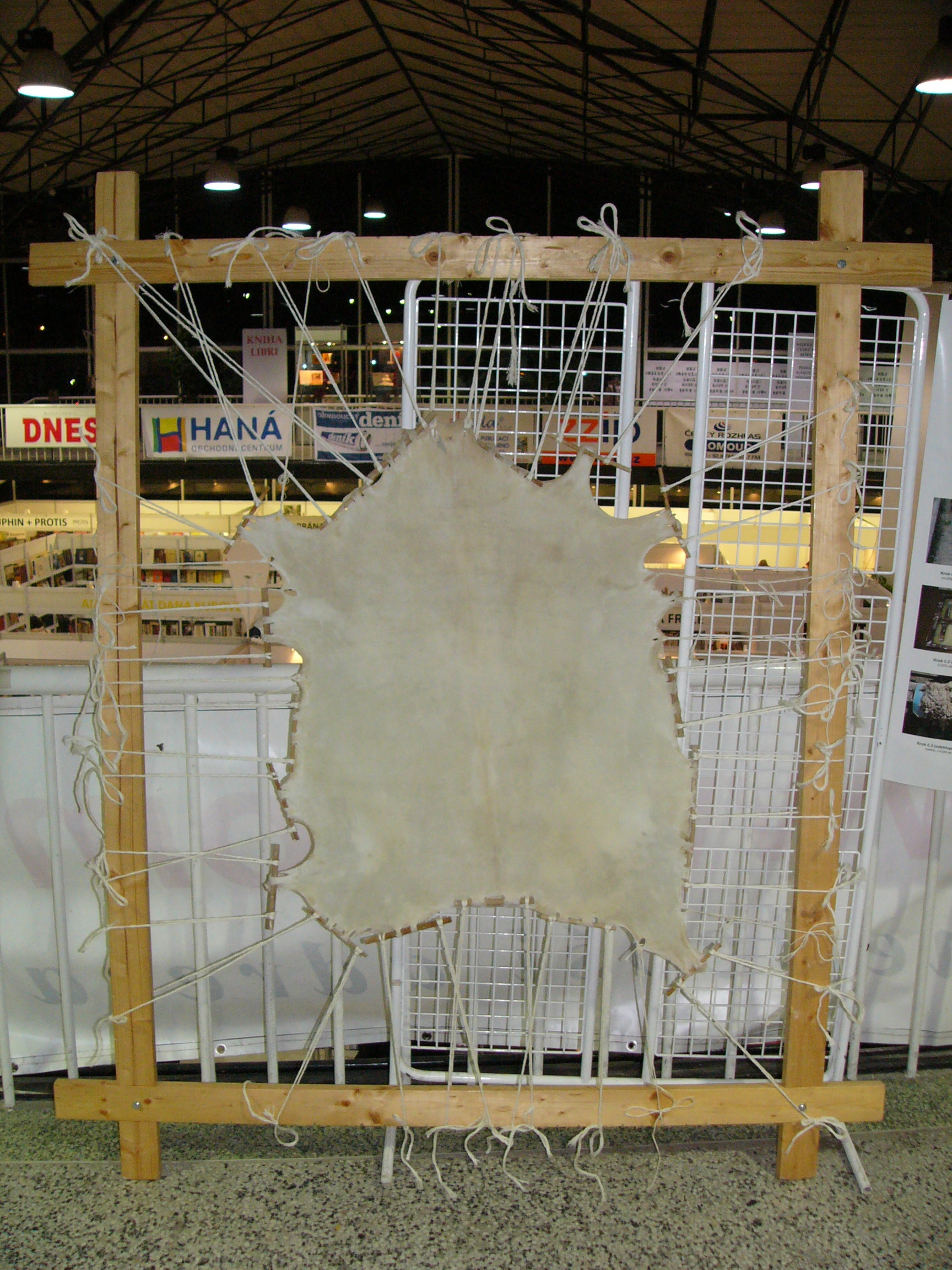
Finished parchment made of goatskin stretched on a wooden frame

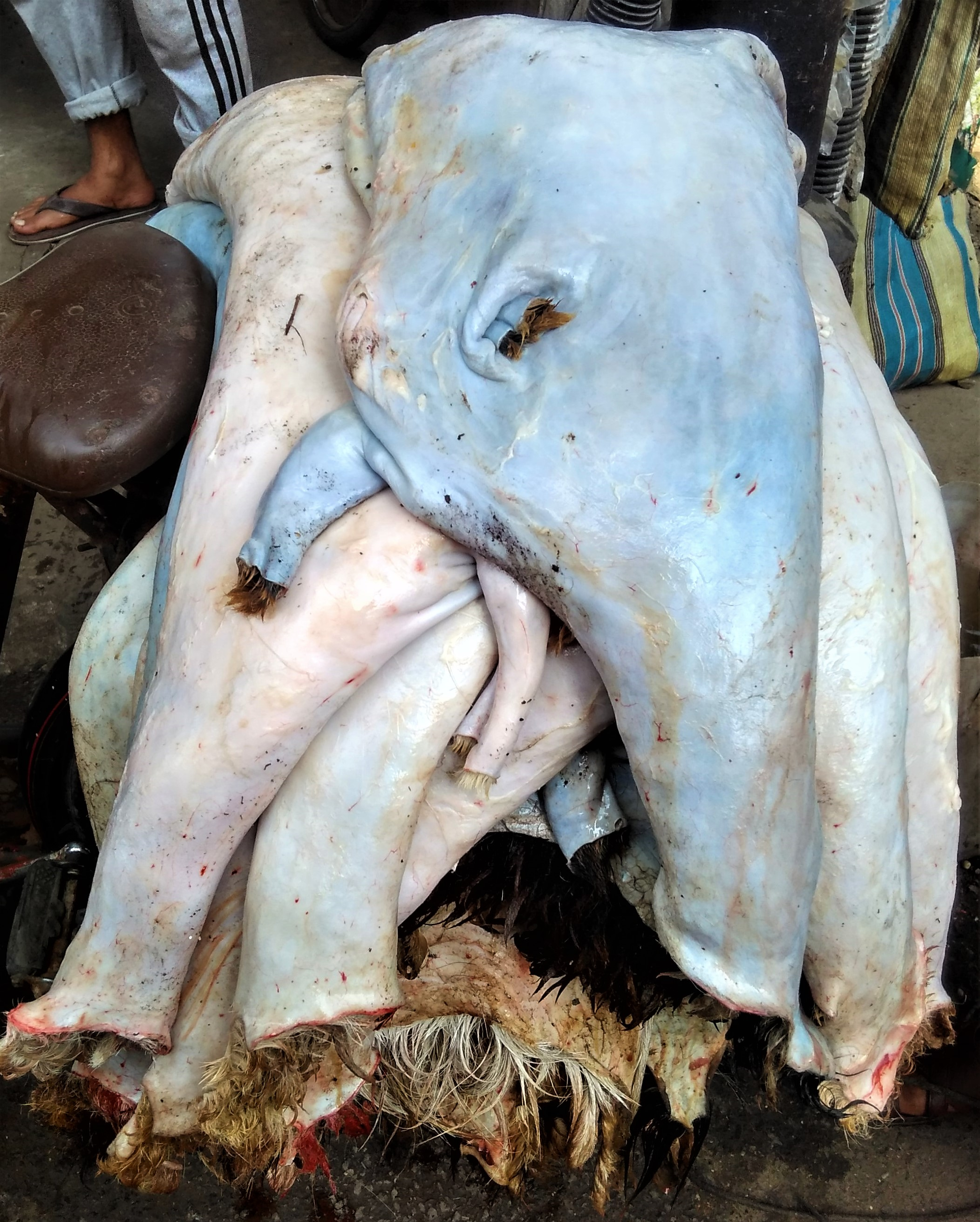
Goat skins

Goatskin refers to the skin of a goat, which by long term usage, is denoted by the term Morocco leather. Kidskin, used for gloves, shoes and other accessories, is traditionally goatskin, although other leathers such as sheep and kangaroo can be used to make kid.

Tanned leather from goatskin is considered extremely durable and is commonly used to make rugs (for example in Indonesia) and carpet binding. It is often used for gloves, boots, and other products that require a soft hide. Kid gloves, popular in Victorian times, are still made today. It has been a major material for leather bookbindings for centuries, and the oldest European binding, that of the St Cuthbert Gospel in the British Library, is in red goatskin. Goatskin is used for a traditional Spanish container for wine bota bag (or called goatskin). Traditional kefir was made in bags from goatskin.

Non-tanned goatskin is used for parchment or for drumheads or sounding boards of some musical instruments, e.g., mišnice in medieval Europe, bodhrán in Ireland, esraj in India and for instrumental drum skin named bedug in Indonesia.

In ancient Rome priests (known as Luperci) wore goatskins during Lupercalia, a pastoral festival.

A breed of goat that provides high-quality skin is for example the Black Bengal breed, native to Bangladesh.

In 1974, there was controversy in the United States surrounding goatskin products originating in Haiti. The U.S. Centers for Disease Control discovered that some of these products contained deadly anthrax spores. All Haitian goatskin products in the USA were recalled, although no fatalities were reported.

== Gallery ==
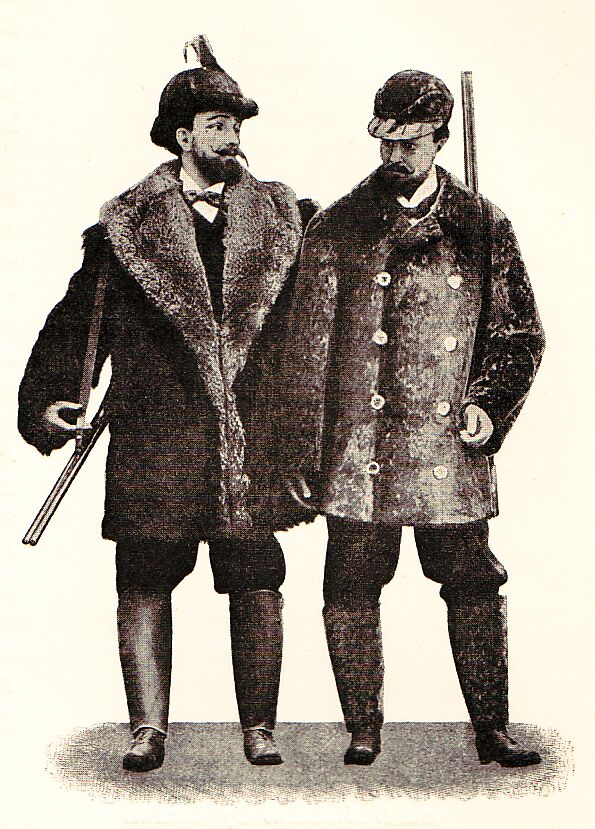
Goatskin and sealskin jacket (1902)

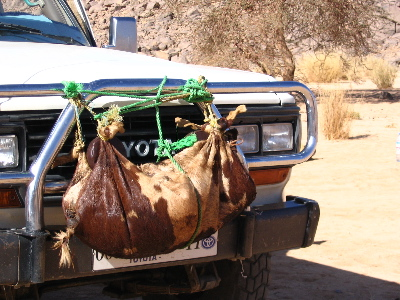
Water reservoir in Algeria

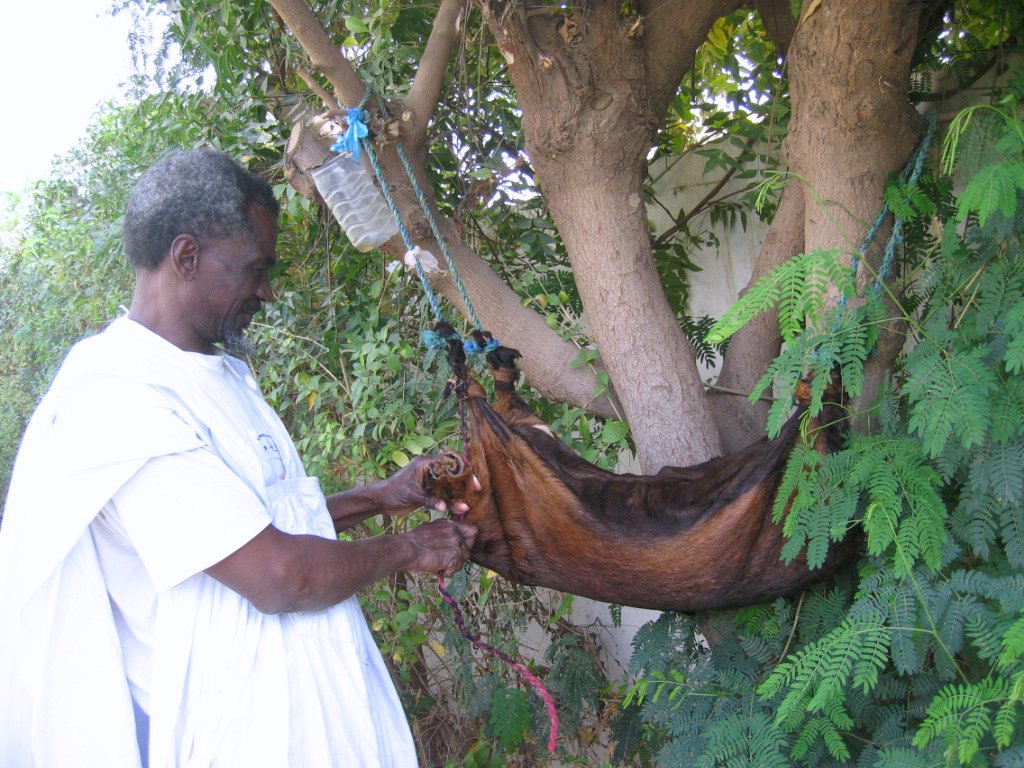
Water reservoir in Mauritania

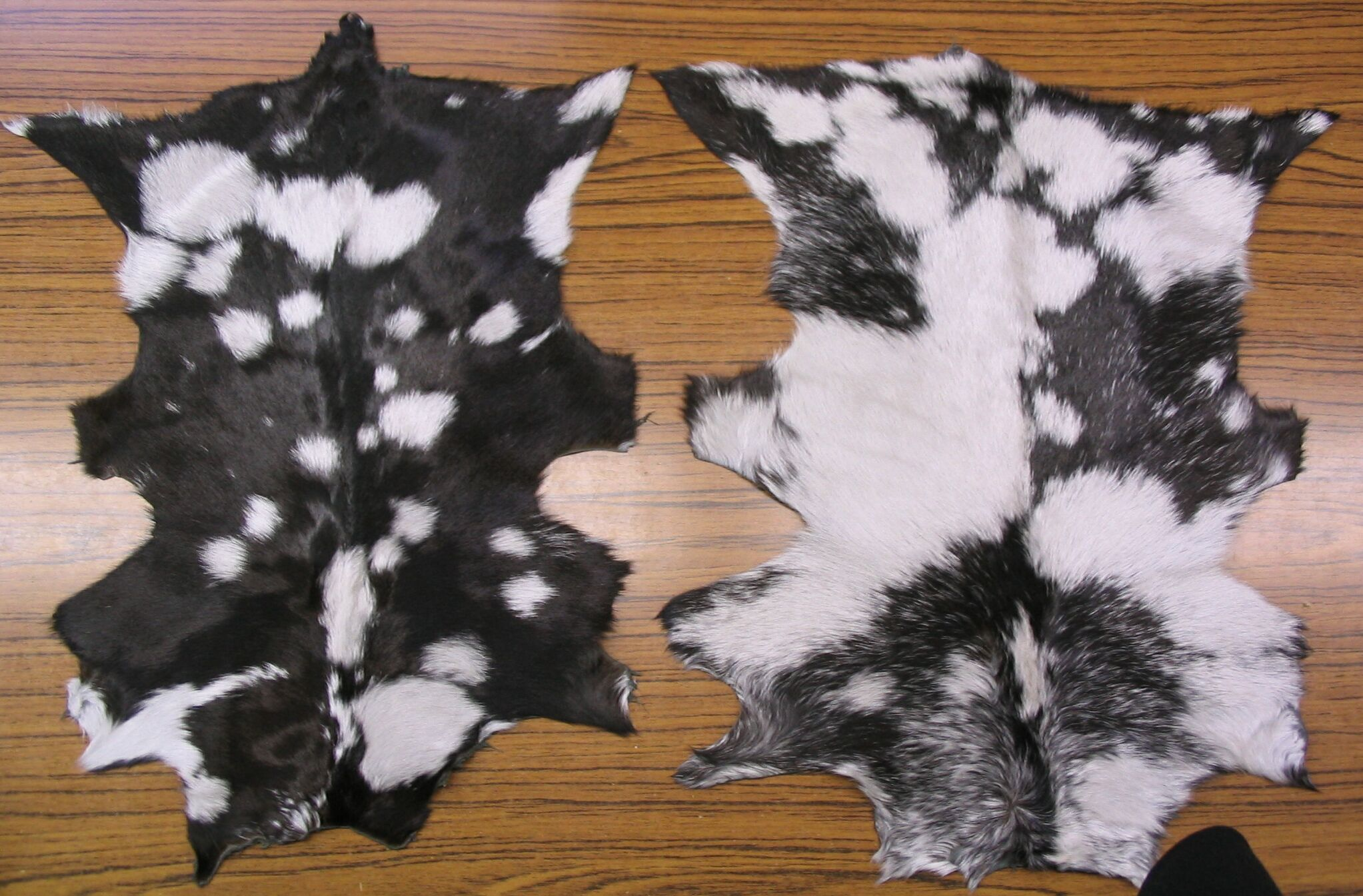
Kid skins

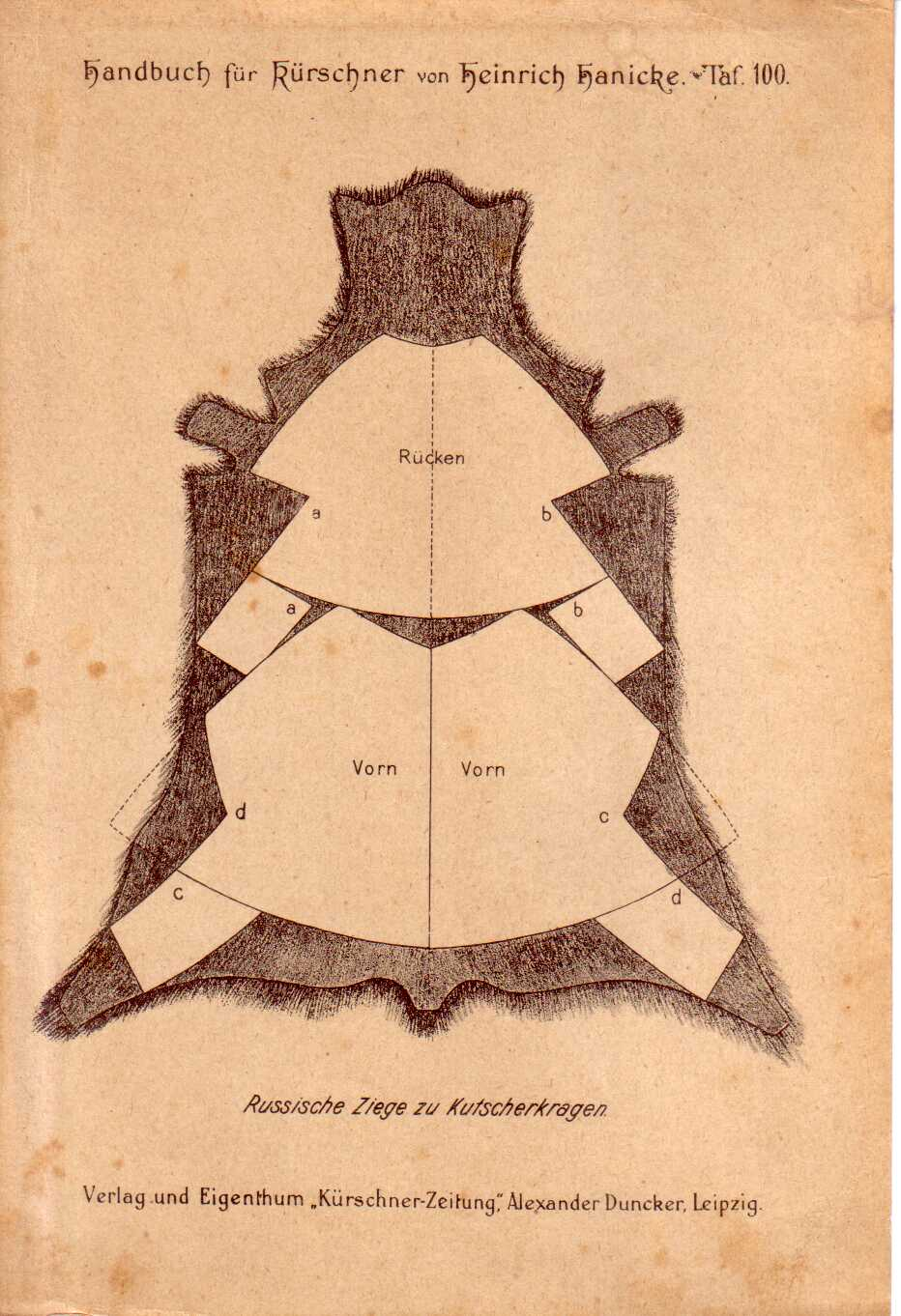
Cut for a goatskin 'coachman collar' (1895)

== See also ==
- Goatskin-producing goat breeds
- Mashk
