= Hureh =

Hureh (Persian: هوره) may refer to:

- Hureh, Chaharmahal and Bakhtiari
- Hureh, Khuzestan
- Hureh Emir, Khuzestan Province
- Hureh-ye Agul-e Bala, Khuzestan Province
- Hureh Rural District, in Chaharmahal and Bakhtiari Province
