= Cham-e Zin =

Village in Chaharmahal and Bakhtiari province, Iran

Cham-e Zin Persian: چمزين
- Village
- Location within Iran
- Coordinates: 32°29′14″N 50°54′43″E
- Country: Iran
- Province: Chaharmahal and Bakhtiari
- County: Saman
- District: Central
- Rural District: Chama

Population (2016)
  - Total: 616
- Time zone: UTC+3:30 (IRST)

Cham-e Zin (Persian: چمزين) (Note: Also romanized as Cham-e Zīn and Chamzīn) is a village in Chama Rural District of the Central District in Saman County, Chaharmahal and Bakhtiari province, Iran.

== Demographics ==
=== Ethnicity ===
The village is populated by Turkic people.

=== Population ===
At the time of the 2006 National Census, the village's population was 691 in 191 households, when it was in Saman Rural District of the former Saman District in Shahrekord County. The following census in 2011 counted 720 people in 229 households. The 2016 census measured the population of the village as 616 people in 199 households, by which time the district had been separated from the county in the establishment of Saman County. The rural district was transferred to the new Central District, and Cham-e Zin was transferred to Chama Rural District created in the district.
