= Cham Khalifeh =

Village in Chaharmahal and Bakhtiari province, Iran

Cham Khalifeh Persian: چم خليفه
- Village
- Location within Iran
- Coordinates: 32°30′21″N 50°52′46″E
- Country: Iran
- Province: Chaharmahal and Bakhtiari
- County: Saman
- District: Central
- Rural District: Chama

Population (2016)
  - Total: 975
- Time zone: UTC+3:30 (IRST)

Cham Khalifeh (Persian: چم خليفه) (Note: Also romanized as Cham Khalīfeh and Cham-e Khalīfeh) is a village in Chama Rural District of the Central District in Saman County, Chaharmahal and Bakhtiari province, Iran.

== Demographics ==
=== Ethnicity ===
The village is populated by Turkic people.

=== Population ===
At the time of the 2006 National Census, the village's population was 885 in 233 households, when it was in Saman Rural District of the former Saman District in Shahrekord County. The following census in 2011 counted 1,015 people in 287 households. The 2016 census measured the population of the village as 975 people in 286 households, by which time the district had been separated from the county in the establishment of Saman County. The rural district was transferred to the new Central District, and Cham Khalifeh was transferred to Chama Rural District created in the same district.
