= Cham Chang =

Village in Chaharmahal and Bakhtiari province, Iran

Cham Chang Persian: چم چنگ
- Village
- Location within Iran
- Coordinates: 32°30′28″N 50°53′14″E
- Country: Iran
- Province: Chaharmahal and Bakhtiari
- County: Saman
- District: Central
- Rural District: Chama

Population (2016)
  - Total: 1,881
- Time zone: UTC+3:30 (IRST)

Cham Chang (Persian: چم چنگ) is a village in, and the capital of, Chama Rural District in the Central District of Saman County, Chaharmahal and Bakhtiari province, Iran.

== Demographics ==
=== Ethnicity ===
The village is populated by Persians.

=== Population ===
At the time of the 2006 National Census, the village's population was 1,455 in 369 households, when it was in Saman Rural District of the former Saman District in Shahrekord County. The following census in 2011 counted 1,648 people in 500 households. The 2016 census measured the population of the village as 1,881 people in 603 households, by which time the district had been separated from the county in the establishment of Saman County. The rural district was transferred to the new Central District, and Cham Chang was transferred to Chama Rural District created in the same district. It was the most populous village in its rural district.
