= Quchan, Chaharmahal and Bakhtiari =

Village in Chaharmahal and Bakhtiari province, Iran

Quchan Persian: قوچان
- Village
- Location within Iran
- Coordinates: 32°39′24″N 50°49′34″E
- Country: Iran
- Province: Chaharmahal and Bakhtiari
- County: Saman
- District: Zayandehrud
- Rural District: Zarrin

Population (2016)
  - Total: 705
- Time zone: UTC+3:30 (IRST)

Quchan (Persian: قوچان) (Note: Also romanized as Qūchān) is a village in Zarrin Rural District of Zayandehrud District in Saman County, Chaharmahal and Bakhtiari province, Iran.

== Demographics ==
=== Ethnicity ===
The village is populated by Turkic people.

=== Population ===
At the time of the 2006 National Census, the village's population was 653 in 178 households, when it was in Hureh Rural District of the former Saman District in Shahrekord County. The following census in 2011 counted 660 people in 214 households. The 2016 census measured the population of the village as 705 people in 225 households, by which time the district had been separated from the county in the establishment of Saman County. The rural district was transferred to the new Zayandehrud District, and Quchan was transferred to Zarrin Rural District created in the district.
