= Cham Ruteh =

Village in Ilam province, Iran

Cham Ruteh Persian: چم روته
- Village
- Location within Iran Location within Ilam Province
- Coordinates: 33°27′21″N 46°57′25″E
- Country: Iran
- Province: Ilam
- County: Sirvan
- District: Central
- Rural District: Rudbar

Population (2016)
  - Total: 522
- Time zone: UTC+3:30 (IRST)

Cham Ruteh (Persian: چم روته) (Note: Also romanized as Cham Rūteh) is a village in Rudbar Rural District of the Central District of Sirvan County, Ilam province, Iran.

== Demographics ==
=== Ethnicity ===
The village is populated by Arabs.

=== Population ===
At the time of the 2006 National Census, the village's population was 481 in 101 households, when it was in Lumar Rural District of the former Shirvan District of Chardavol County. (Note: Formerly Shirvan and Chardavol County) The following census in 2011 counted 514 people in 140 households. The 2016 census measured the population of the village as 522 people in 153 households, by which time the district had been separated from the county in the establishment of Sirvan County. The rural district was transferred to the new Central District, and Cham Ruteh was transferred to Rudbar Rural District created in the district. It was the most populous village in its rural district.
