= Garmdarreh, Chaharmahal and Bakhtiari =

Village in Chaharmahal and Bakhtiari province, Iran

Garmdarreh Persian: گرمدره
- Village
- Location within Iran
- Coordinates: 32°41′20″N 50°48′57″E
- Country: Iran
- Province: Chaharmahal and Bakhtiari
- County: Saman
- District: Zayandehrud
- Rural District: Zarrin

Population (2016)
  - Total: 1,315
- Time zone: UTC+3:30 (IRST)

Garmdarreh (Persian: گرمدره) is a village in, and the capital of, Zarrin Rural District in Zayandehrud District of Saman County, Chaharmahal and Bakhtiari province, Iran.

== Demographics ==
=== Ethnicity ===
The village is populated by Turkic people.

=== Population ===
At the time of the 2006 National Census, the village's population was 1,104 in 288 households, when it was in Hureh Rural District of the former Saman District in Shahrekord County. The following census in 2011 counted 1,204 people in 386 households. The 2016 census measured the population of the village as 1,315 people in 433 households, by which time the district had been separated from the county in the establishment of Saman County. The rural district was transferred to the new Zayandehrud District, and Garmdarreh was transferred to Zarrin Rural District created in the same district.
