= Cheshmeh Rashid =

Neighborhood in Ilam province, Iran

Cheshmeh Rashid Persian: چشمه رشيد
- Neighborhood
- Location within Iran Location within Ilam Province
- Coordinates: 33°43′56″N 46°31′40″E
- Country: Iran
- Province: Ilam
- County: Sirvan
- District: Karezan
- Rural District: Karezan
- Village: Karezan

Population (2016)
  - Total: 249
- Time zone: UTC+3:30 (IRST)

Cheshmeh Rashid (Persian: چشمه رشيد) (Note: Also romanized as Cheshmeh Rashīd) is a neighborhood in the village of Karezan in Karezan Rural District of Karezan District in Sirvan County, Ilam province, Iran.

== Population ==
At the time of the 2006 National Census, Cheshmeh Rashid's population was 274 in 58 households, when it was a village in Karezan Rural District of the former Shirvan District in Chardavol County. (Note: Formerly Shirvan and Chardavol County) The following census in 2011 counted 280 people in 72 households. The 2016 census measured the population of the village as 249 people in 75 households, by which time the district had been separated from the county in the establishment of Sirvan County. The rural district was transferred to the new Karezan District.

In 2023, the villages of Cheshmeh Pahn and Cheshmeh Rashid were merged to form the village of Karezan.
