= Markdeh =

Village in Chaharmahal and Bakhtiari province, Iran

Markdeh Persian: مارکده
- Village
- Location within Iran
- Coordinates: 32°39′15″N 50°49′58″E
- Country: Iran
- Province: Chaharmahal and Bakhtiari
- County: Saman
- District: Zayandehrud
- Rural District: Zarrin

Population (2016)
  - Total: 1,601
- Time zone: UTC+3:30 (IRST)

Markdeh (Persian: مارکده) is a village in Zarrin Rural District of Zayandehrud District in Saman County, Chaharmahal and Bakhtiari province, Iran.

== Demographics ==
=== Population ===
At the time of the 2006 National Census, the village's population was 1,348 in 392 households, when it was in Hureh Rural District of the former Saman District in Shahrekord County. The following census in 2011 counted 1,528 people in 487 households. The 2016 census measured the population of the village as 1,601 people in 520 households, by which time the district had been separated from the county in the establishment of Saman County. The rural district was transferred to the new Zayandehrud District, and the village was transferred to Zarrin Rural District created in the district. Markdeh was the most populous village in its rural district.
