= Baqeleh =

Baqeleh (Persian: باقله) may refer to several places in Iran:

- Baqeleh, Kermanshah
- Baqeleh, Harsin, Kermanshah Province
- Baqeleh-ye Olya, Kermanshah Province
- Baqeleh-ye Sofla, Kermanshah Province

== See also ==
- Baqleh, a village in Sirvan County, Ilam Province, Iran
- Baghlah, an Arabic sailing vessel
