= Qaraqush, Iran =

Village in Chaharmahal and Bakhtiari province, Iran

Qaraqush Persian: قرا قوش
- Village
- Location within Iran
- Coordinates: 32°41′51″N 50°48′06″E
- Country: Iran
- Province: Chaharmahal and Bakhtiari
- County: Saman
- District: Zayandehrud
- Rural District: Zarrin

Population (2016)
  - Total: 148
- Time zone: UTC+3:30 (IRST)

Qaraqush (Persian: قرا قوش) (Note: Also romanized as Qarāqūsh; also known as Gharaghoosh, Qarāgāch, and Qareh Qāch) is a village in Zarrin Rural District of Zayandehrud District in Saman County, Chaharmahal and Bakhtiari province, Iran.

== Demographics ==
=== Ethnicity ===
The village is populated by Turkic people.

=== Population ===
At the time of the 2006 National Census, the village's population was 114 in 36 households, when it was in Hureh Rural District of the former Saman District in Shahrekord County. The following census in 2011 counted 124 people in 42 households. The 2016 census measured the population of the village as 148 people in 48 households, by which time the district had been separated from the county in the establishment of Saman County. The rural district was transferred to the new Zayandehrud District, and Qaraqush was transferred to Zarrin Rural District created in the district.
