= Sarkan (disambiguation) =

Sarkan is a city in Hamadan province, Iran.

Sarkan (Persian: سركان or سركن) may also refer to:

- Sarkan, Ilam (سركان - Sarkān)
- Sarkan, Kermanshah (سركن - Sarkan)
- Sarkan-e Olya Khuzestan province
- Sarkan-e Sofla Khuzestan province

== See also ==
- Sarkun (disambiguation)
