= Cham-e Ali =

Village in Chaharmahal and Bakhtiari province, Iran

Cham-e Ali Persian: چمعالي
- Village
- Location within Iran
- Coordinates: 32°29′47″N 50°53′29″E
- Country: Iran
- Province: Chaharmahal and Bakhtiari
- County: Saman
- District: Central
- Rural District: Chama

Population (2016)
  - Total: 560
- Time zone: UTC+3:30 (IRST)

Cham-e Ali (Persian: چمعالي) (Note: Also romanized as Cham ‘Ālī and Cham-e ‘Alī) is a village in Chama Rural District of the Central District in Saman County, Chaharmahal and Bakhtiari province, Iran.

== Demographics ==
=== Ethnicity ===
The village is populated by Turkic people.

=== Population ===
At the time of the 2006 National Census, the village's population was 545 in 148 households, when it was in Saman Rural District of the former Saman District in Shahrekord County. The following census in 2011 counted 630 people in 189 households. The 2016 census measured the population of the village as 560 people in 187 households, by which time the district had been separated from the county in the establishment of Saman County. The rural district was transferred to the new Central District, and Cham-e Ali was transferred to Chama Rural District created in the district.
