= Savad Jan =

Village in Chaharmahal and Bakhtiari province, Iran

Savad Jan Persian: سوادجان
- Village
- Location within Iran
- Coordinates: 32°32′57″N 50°51′46″E
- Country: Iran
- Province: Chaharmahal and Bakhtiari
- County: Saman
- District: Zayandehrud
- Rural District: Hureh

Population (2016)
  - Total: 1,316
- Time zone: UTC+3:30 (IRST)

Savad Jan (Persian: سوادجان) (Note: Also romanized as Savād Jān; also known as Savār Jān) is a village in Hureh Rural District of Zayandehrud District in Saman County, Chaharmahal and Bakhtiari province, Iran.

== Demographics ==
=== Ethnicity ===
The village is populated by Turkic people.

=== Population ===
At the time of the 2006 National Census, the village's population was 1,389 in 370 households, when it was in the former Saman District of Shahrekord County. The following census in 2011 counted 1,443 people in 404 households. The 2016 census measured the population of the village as 1,316 people in 429 households, by which time the district had been separated from the county in the establishment of Saman County. The rural district was transferred to the new Zayandehrud District.
