= Chelvan =

Village in Chaharmahal and Bakhtiari province, Iran

Chelvan Persian: چلوان
- Village
- Location within Iran
- Coordinates: 32°29′01″N 50°55′15″E
- Country: Iran
- Province: Chaharmahal and Bakhtiari
- County: Saman
- District: Central
- Rural District: Saman

Population (2016)
  - Total: 740
- Time zone: UTC+3:30 (IRST)

Chelvan (Persian: چلوان) (Note: Also romanized as Chalevān, Chalvān, and Chelvān) is a village in Saman Rural District of the Central District in Saman County, Chaharmahal and Bakhtiari province, Iran.

== Demographics ==
=== Ethnicity ===
The village is populated by Turkic people.

=== Population ===
At the time of the 2006 National Census, the village's population was 718 in 199 households, when it was in the former Saman District of Shahrekord County. The following census in 2011 counted 778 people in 226 households. The 2016 census measured the population of the village as 740 people in 233 households, by which time the district had been separated from the county in the establishment of Saman County. The rural district was transferred to the new Central District.
