= Fatemiyeh, Sirvan =

Fatemiyeh فاطميه
- Village
- Location within Iran
- Coordinates: 33°33′29″N 46°47′30″E
- Country: Iran
- Province: Ilam
- County: Sirvan
- Bakhsh: Central
- Rural District: Lumar

Population (2006)
  - Total: 19
- Time zone: UTC+3:30 (IRST)
  - Summer (DST): UTC+4:30 (IRDT)

Fatemiyeh (Persian: فاطميه, also Romanized as Fāţemīyeh) is a village in Lumar Rural District, Central District, Sirvan County, Ilam Province, Iran. At the 2006 census, its population was 19, in 5 families. The village is populated by Kurds.
