= Dashti, Chaharmahal and Bakhtiari =

Village in Chaharmahal and Bakhtiari province, Iran

Dashti Persian: دشتي
- Village
- Location within Iran
- Coordinates: 32°32′36″N 50°51′22″E
- Country: Iran
- Province: Chaharmahal and Bakhtiari
- County: Saman
- District: Zayandehrud
- Rural District: Hureh

Population (2016)
  - Total: 835
- Time zone: UTC+3:30 (IRST)

Dashti (Persian: دشتي) (Note: Also romanized as Dashtī) is a village in Hureh Rural District of Zayandehrud District in Saman County, Chaharmahal and Bakhtiari province, Iran.

== Demographics ==
=== Ethnicity ===
The village is populated by Turkic people.

=== Population ===
At the time of the 2006 National Census, the village's population was 963 in 245 households, when it was in the former Saman District of Shahrekord County. The following census in 2011 counted 910 people in 280 households. The 2016 census measured the population of the village as 835 people in 259 households, by which time the district had been separated from the county in the establishment of Saman County. The rural district was transferred to the new Zayandehrud District.
