= Lala, Ilam =

Lala لالا
- Village
- Location within Iran
- Coordinates: 33°33′33″N 46°46′09″E
- Country: Iran
- Province: Ilam
- County: Sirvan
- Bakhsh: Central
- Rural District: Lumar

Population (2006)
  - Total: 175
- Time zone: UTC+3:30 (IRST)
  - Summer (DST): UTC+4:30 (IRDT)

Lala (Persian: لالا, also Romanized as Lālā) is a village in Lumar Rural District, Central District, Sirvan County, Ilam Province, Iran. At the 2006 census, its population was 175, in 32 families. The village is populated by Kurds.
