= Zoheyri-ye Olya =

Village in Ilam province, Iran

Zoheyri-ye Olya Persian: ظهيري عليا
- Village
- Location within Iran Location within Ilam Province
- Coordinates: 33°31′00″N 46°51′12″E
- Country: Iran
- Province: Ilam
- County: Sirvan
- District: Central
- Rural District: Rudbar

Population (2016)
  - Total: 49
- Time zone: UTC+3:30 (IRST)

Zoheyri-ye Olya (Persian: ظهيري عليا) (Note: Also romanized as Z̧oheyrī-ye ‘Olyā; also known as Cham Gerdāb and Z̧oheyrī) is a village in, and the capital of, Rudbar Rural District of the Central District of Sirvan County, Ilam province, Iran.

== Demographics ==
=== Ethnicity ===
The village is populated by Kurds.

=== Population ===
At the time of the 2006 National Census, the village's population was 115 in 29 households, when it was in Lumar Rural District of the former Shirvan District of Chardavol County. (Note: Formerly Shirvan and Chardavol County) The following census in 2011 counted 66 people in 20 households. The 2016 census measured the population of the village as 49 people in 16 households, by which time the district had been separated from the county in the establishment of Sirvan County. The rural district was transferred to the new Central District. Zoheyri-ye Olya was transferred to Rudbar Rural District created in the district.
