= Gurab-e Sofla, Sirvan =

Gurab-e Sofla گورابسفلي
- Village
- Location within Iran
- Coordinates: 33°34′00″N 46°44′47″E
- Country: Iran
- Province: Ilam
- County: Sirvan
- Bakhsh: Central
- Rural District: Lumar

Population (2006)
  - Total: 213
- Time zone: UTC+3:30 (IRST)
  - Summer (DST): UTC+4:30 (IRDT)

Gurab-e Sofla (Persian: گورابسفلي, also Romanized as Gūrāb-e Soflá; also known as Gūrāb-e Pā’īn) is a village in Lumar Rural District, Central District, Sirvan County, Ilam Province, Iran. At the 2006 census, its population was 213, in 44 families. The village is populated by Kurds.
