= Sadeqabad, Chaharmahal and Bakhtiari =

Village in Chaharmahal and Bakhtiari province, Iran

Sadeqabad Persian: صادق آباد
- Village
- Location within Iran
- Coordinates: 32°37′50″N 50°50′47″E
- Country: Iran
- Province: Chaharmahal and Bakhtiari
- County: Saman
- District: Zayandehrud
- Rural District: Hureh

Population (2016)
  - Total: 633
- Time zone: UTC+3:30 (IRST)

Sadeqabad (Persian: صادق آباد) (Note: Also romanized as Şādeqābād; also known as Sadegh Abad) is a village in Hureh Rural District of Zayandehrud District in Saman County, Chaharmahal and Bakhtiari province, Iran.

== Demographics ==
=== Ethnicity ===
The village is populated by Turkic people.

=== Population ===
At the time of the 2006 National Census, the village's population was 606 in 167 households, when it was in the former Saman District of Shahrekord County. The following census in 2011 counted 677 people in 200 households. The 2016 census measured the population of the village as 633 people in 192 households, by which time the district had been separated from the county in the establishment of Saman County. The rural district was transferred to the new Zayandehrud District.
