= Chegeni, Ilam =

Chegeni چگني
- Village
- Location within Iran
- Coordinates: 33°33′21″N 46°46′38″E
- Country: Iran
- Province: Ilam
- County: Sirvan
- Bakhsh: Central
- Rural District: Lumar

Population (2006)
  - Total: 183
- Time zone: UTC+3:30 (IRST)
  - Summer (DST): UTC+4:30 (IRDT)

Chegeni (Persian: چگني, also Romanized as Chegenī; also known as Chegīnī) is a village in Lumar Rural District, Central District, Sirvan County, Ilam Province, Iran. At the 2006 census, its population was 183, in 35 families. The village is populated by Kurds.
