= Cheshmeh Khazaneh =

Village in Ilam province, Iran

Cheshmeh Khazaneh Persian: چشمه خزانه
- Village
- Location within Iran Location within Ilam Province
- Coordinates: 33°44′27″N 46°30′32″E
- Country: Iran
- Province: Ilam
- County: Sirvan
- District: Karezan
- Rural District: Karezan

Population (2016)
  - Total: 645
- Time zone: UTC+3:30 (IRST)

Cheshmeh Khazaneh (Persian: چشمه خزانه) (Note: Also romanized as Cheshmeh Khazāneh; also known as Cheshmeh Kamūl Kharzān) is a village in Karezan Rural District of Karezan District, Sirvan County, Ilam province, Iran.

== Demographics ==
=== Ethnicity ===
The village is populated by Kurds.

=== Population ===
At the time of the 2006 National Census, the village's population was 808 in 145 households, when it was in the former Shirvan District of Chardavol County. The following census in 2011 counted 797 people in 183 households. The 2016 census measured the population of the village as 645 people in 180 households, by which time the district had been separated from the county in the establishment of Sirvan County. The rural district was transferred to the new Karezan District. It was the most populous village in its rural district.
