= Aliabad-e Olya, Ilam =

Aliabad-e Olya علي ابادعليا
- village
- Location within Ilam Province Location within Iran
- Coordinates: 33°41′22″N 46°34′48″E
- Country: Iran
- Province: Ilam
- County: Sirvan
- Bakhsh: Karezan
- Rural District: Karezan

Population (2006)
  - Total: 292
- Time zone: UTC+3:30 (IRST)
  - Summer (DST): UTC+4:30 (IRDT)

Aliabad-e Olya (Persian: علي ابادعليا, also Romanized as ‘Ālīābād-e ‘Olyā; also known as Sar Koleh-ye ‘Alīābād) is a village in Karezan Rural District, Karezan District, Sirvan County, Ilam Province, Iran. At the 2006 census, its population was 292, in 58 families. The village is populated by Kurds.
