= Shahivand =

Shahivand (Persian: شاهيوند) may refer to:

- Shahivand, alternate name of Eslamiyeh, Ilam
- Shahivand, alternate name of Heyvand, Ilam Province
- Shahivand District
- Shahivand Ali Morad
