= Yaseh Cha =

Village in Chaharmahal and Bakhtiari province, Iran

Yaseh Cha Persian: ياسه چا
- Village
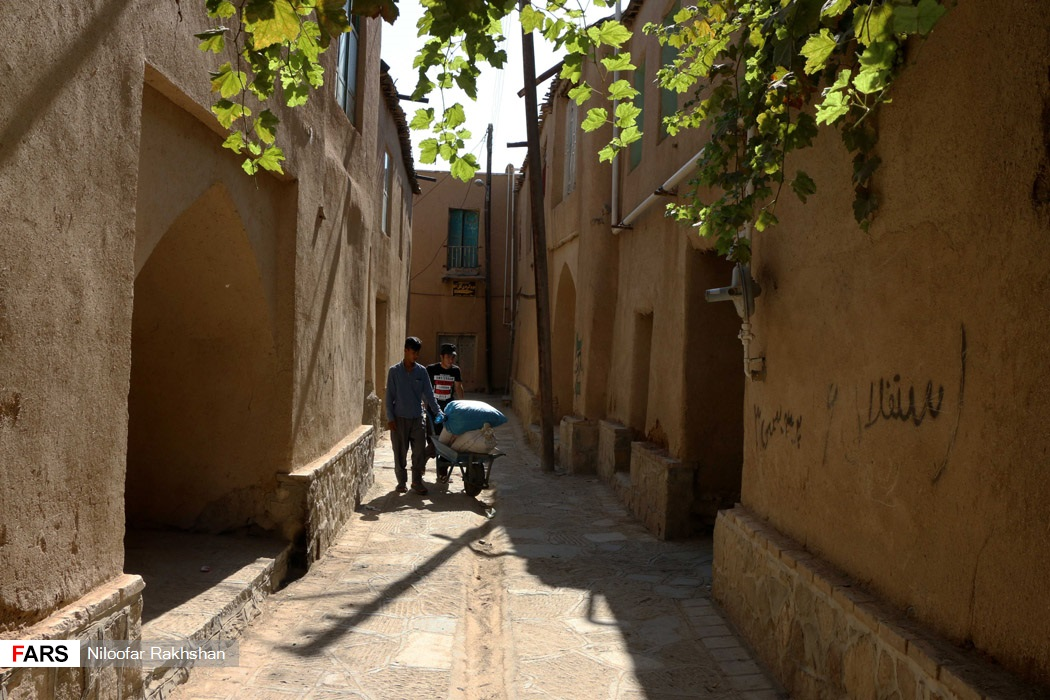
- Street in Yaseh Cha

- Location within Iran
- Coordinates: 32°37′33″N 50°50′56″E
- Country: Iran
- Province: Chaharmahal and Bakhtiari
- County: Saman
- District: Zayandehrud
- Rural District: Hureh

Population (2016)
  - Total: 586
- Time zone: UTC+3:30 (IRST)

Yaseh Cha (Persian: ياسه چا) (Note: Also romanized as Yāseh Chā) is a village in Hureh Rural District of Zayandehrud District in Saman County, Chaharmahal and Bakhtiari province, Iran.

== Demographics ==
=== Ethnicity ===
The village is populated by Turkic people.

=== Population ===
At the time of the 2006 National Census, the village's population was 702 in 222 households, when it was in the former Saman District of Shahrekord County. The following census in 2011 counted 762 people in 238 households. The 2016 census measured the population of the village as 586 people in 198 households, by which time the district had been separated from the county in the establishment of Saman County. The rural district was transferred to the new Zayandehrud District.
