= Shurab-e Saghir =

Village in Chaharmahal and Bakhtiari province, Iran

Shurab-e Saghir Persian: شوراب صغير
- Village
- Location within Iran
- Coordinates: 32°29′26″N 50°56′54″E
- Country: Iran
- Province: Chaharmahal and Bakhtiari
- County: Saman
- District: Central
- Rural District: Saman

Population (2016)
  - Total: 3,294
- Time zone: UTC+3:30 (IRST)

Shurab-e Saghir (Persian: شوراب صغير) (Note: Also romanized as Shoorab Saghir and Shūrāb-e Şaghīr; also known as Shūr Āb) is a village in, and the capital of, Saman Rural District in the Central District of Saman County, Chaharmahal and Bakhtiari province, Iran.

== Demographics ==
=== Ethnicity ===
The village is populated by Turkic people.

=== Population ===
At the time of the 2006 National Census, the village's population was 2,743 in 694 households, when it was in the former Saman District of Shahrekord County. The following census in 2011 counted 2,985 people in 837 households. The 2016 census measured the population of the village as 3,294 people in 1,015 households, by which time the district had been separated from the county in the establishment of Saman County. The rural district was transferred to the new Central District. It was the most populous village in its rural district.
