= Kah Kesh =

Village in Chaharmahal and Bakhtiari province, Iran

Kah Kesh Persian: كاهكش
- Village
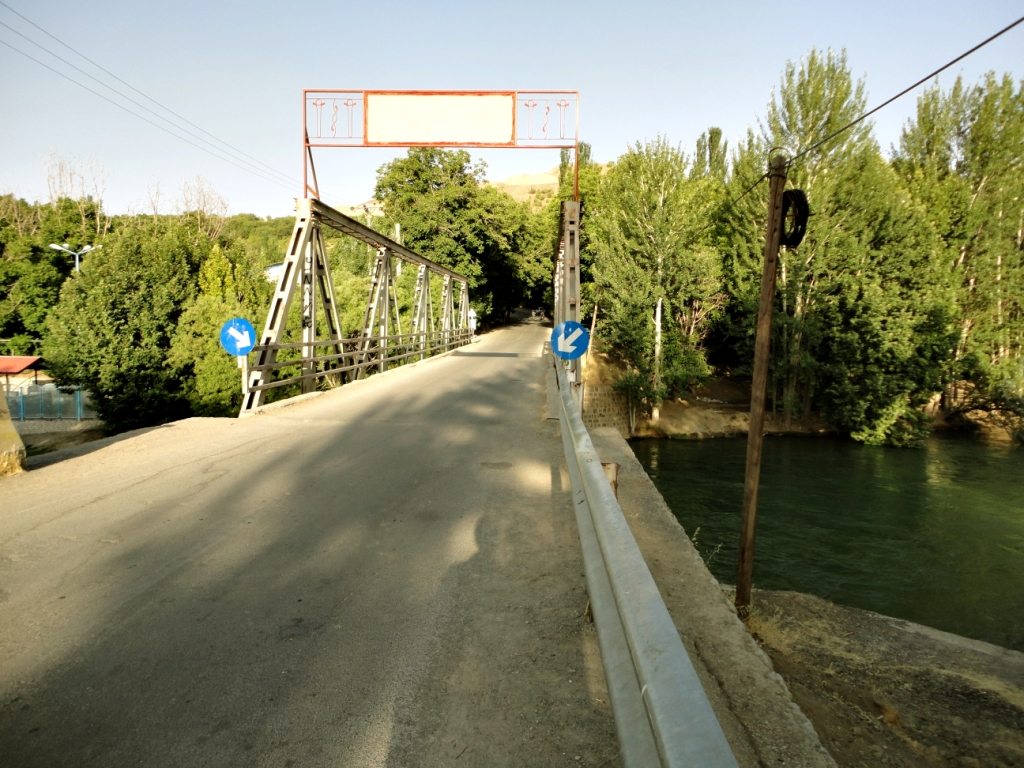
- Bridge at Kah Kesh

- Location within Iran
- Coordinates: 32°28′25″N 50°56′23″E
- Country: Iran
- Province: Chaharmahal and Bakhtiari
- County: Saman
- District: Central
- Rural District: Saman

Population (2016)
  - Total: 749
- Time zone: UTC+3:30 (IRST)

Kah Kesh (Persian: كاهكش) (Note: Also romanized as Kāh Kash and Kāh Kesh; also known as Kākhesh) is a village in Saman Rural District of the Central District in Saman County, Chaharmahal and Bakhtiari province, Iran.

== Demographics ==
=== Ethnicity ===
The village is populated by Turkic people.

=== Population ===
At the time of the 2006 National Census, the village's population was 773 in 206 households, when it was in the former Saman District of Shahrekord County. The following census in 2011 counted 764 people in 225 households. The 2016 census measured the population of the village as 749 people in 248 households, by which time the district had been separated from the county in the establishment of Saman County. The rural district was transferred to the new Central District.
