= Cheshmeh Chai =

Cheshmeh Chai (Persian: چشمه چاي), also rendered as Cheshmeh Chahi, may refer to:

- Cheshmeh Chai-ye Olya
- Cheshmeh Chai-ye Sofla
- Cheshmeh Chai-ye Vosta
