= Mohammadabad-e Tabatabayi =

Village in Chaharmahal and Bakhtiari province, Iran

Mohammadabad-e Tabatabayi Persian: محمدابادطباطبائي
- Village
- Location within Iran
- Coordinates: 32°32′53″N 50°59′10″E
- Country: Iran
- Province: Chaharmahal and Bakhtiari
- County: Saman
- District: Central
- Rural District: Saman

Population (2016)
  - Total: 67
- Time zone: UTC+3:30 (IRST)

Mohammadabad-e Tabatabayi (Persian: محمدابادطباطبائي) (Note: Also romanized as Moḩammadābād-e Ţabāṭabāyī; also known as Moḩammadābād) is a village in Saman Rural District of the Central District of Saman County, Chaharmahal and Bakhtiari province, Iran.

== Demographics ==
=== Population ===
At the time of the 2006 National Census, the village's population was 98 in 22 households, when it was in the former Saman District of Shahrekord County. The following census in 2011 counted 74 people in 24 households. The 2016 census measured the population of the village as 67 people in 23 households, by which time the district had been separated from the county in the establishment of Saman County. The rural district was transferred to the new Central District.
