= Aliabad-e Sofla, Ilam =

Aliabad-e Sofla علي ابادسفلي
- Village
- Location within Iran
- Coordinates: 33°40′24″N 46°35′51″E
- Country: Iran
- Province: Ilam
- County: Sirvan
- Bakhsh: Karezan
- Rural District: Karezan

Population (2006)
  - Total: 91
- Time zone: UTC+3:30 (IRST)
  - Summer (DST): UTC+4:30 (IRDT)

Aliabad-e Sofla (Persian: علي ابادسفلي, also Romanized as ‘Ālīābād-e Soflá) is a village in Karezan Rural District, Karezan District, Sirvan County, Ilam Province, Iran. At the 2006 census, its population was 91, in 24 families. The village is populated by Kurds.
