= Emarat (disambiguation) =

Emarat or Imarat or Amarat (Persian: عمارت) may refer to:

- Emarat, Ardabil
- Emarat, East Azerbaijan
- Emarat, Kazerun, Fars Province
- Emarat, Rostam, Fars Province
- Emarat, Ilam
- Amarat, Kermanshah
- Emarat, Kohgiluyeh and Boyer-Ahmad
- Emarat, Lorestan
- Emarat, Markazi
- Emarat, Esfarayen, North Khorasan
- Emarat, Jajrom, North Khorasan
- Emarat, Razavi Khorasan
