= Gurab-e Olya, Sirvan =

Gurab-e Olya گورابعليا
- Village
- Location within Iran
- Coordinates: 33°33′14″N 46°43′56″E
- Country: Iran
- Province: Ilam
- County: Sirvan
- Bakhsh: Central
- Rural District: Lumar

Population (2006)
  - Total: 154
- Time zone: UTC+3:30 (IRST)
  - Summer (DST): UTC+4:30 (IRDT)

Gurab-e Olya (Persian: گورابعليا, also Romanized as Gūrāb-e ‘Olyā and Gūrab-e ‘Olyā) is a village in Lumar Rural District, Central District, Sirvan County, Ilam Province, Iran. At the 2006 census, its population was 154, in 30 families. The village is populated by Kurds.
