= Karezan =

Village in Ilam province, Iran

Karezan Persian: کارزان
- Village
- Location within Iran Location within Ilam Province
- Coordinates: 33°43′55″N 46°31′51″E
- Country: Iran
- Province: Ilam
- County: Sirvan
- District: Karezan
- Rural District: Karezan
- Time zone: UTC+3:30 (IRST)

Karezan (Persian: كارزان) is a village in Karezan Rural District of Karezan District, Sirvan County, Ilam province, Iran, serving as capital of both the district and the rural district. The previous capital of the district and the rural district was the village of Cheshmeh Pahn, now a neighborhood in Karezan.

== History ==
In 2023, the villages of Cheshmeh Pahn and Cheshmeh Rashid were merged to form the village of Karezan.
