= Cham Jangal, Ilam =

Cham Jangal چم جنگل
- Village
- Location within Iran
- Coordinates: 33°30′28″N 46°52′49″E
- Country: Iran
- Province: Ilam
- County: Sirvan
- Bakhsh: Central
- Rural District: Rudbar

Population (2006)
  - Total: 241
- Time zone: UTC+3:30 (IRST)
  - Summer (DST): UTC+4:30 (IRDT)

Cham Jangal (Persian: چم جنگل) is a village in Rudbar Rural District, Central District, Sirvan County, Ilam Province, Iran. At the 2006 census, its population was 241, in 49 families. The village is populated by Kurds.
