= Zoheyri-ye Sofla =

Zoheyri-ye Sofla ظهيري سفلي
- Village
- Location within Iran
- Coordinates: 33°31′07″N 46°51′17″E
- Country: Iran
- Province: Ilam
- County: Sirvan
- Bakhsh: Central
- Rural District: Rudbar

Population (2006)
  - Total: 211
- Time zone: UTC+3:30 (IRST)
  - Summer (DST): UTC+4:30 (IRDT)

Zoheyri-ye Sofla (Persian: ظهيري سفلي, also Romanized as Z̧oheyrī-ye Soflá; also known as Z̧oheyrī) is a village in Rudbar Rural District, Central District, Sirvan County, Ilam Province, Iran. At the 2006 census, its population was 211, in 50 families. The village is populated by Kurds.
