= Baghleh =

Baghleh باغله
- Village
- Location within Iran
- Coordinates: 33°31′42″N 46°49′18″E
- Country: Iran
- Province: Ilam
- County: Sirvan
- Bakhsh: Central
- Rural District: Rudbar

Population (2006)
  - Total: 166
- Time zone: UTC+3:30 (IRST)
  - Summer (DST): UTC+4:30 (IRDT)

Baghleh (Persian: باغله, also Romanized as Bāghleh; also known as Bāqleh) is a village in Rudbar Rural District, Central District, Sirvan County, Ilam Province, Iran. At the 2006 census, its population was 166, in 36 families. The village is populated by Kurds.
