= Cheshmeh Chai-ye Sofla =

Village in Ilam, Iran

Cheshmeh Chai-ye Sofla چشمه چاي سفلي
- Village
- Location within Iran
- Coordinates: 33°40′29″N 46°33′52″E
- Country: Iran
- Province: Ilam
- County: Sirvan
- Bakhsh: Karezan
- Rural District: Karezan

Population (2006)
  - Total: 87
- Time zone: UTC+3:30 (IRST)
  - Summer (DST): UTC+4:30 (IRDT)

Cheshmeh Chai-ye Sofla (Persian: چشمه چاي سفلي, also Romanized as Cheshmeh Chāī-ye Soflá; also known as Cheshmeh Chāhī-ye Soflá) is a village in Karezan Rural District, Karezan District, Sirvan County, Ilam Province, Iran. At the 2006 census, its population was 87, in 20 families. The village is populated by Kurds.
