= Emarat, Ilam =

Emarat عمارت
- Village
- Location within Iran
- Coordinates: 33°32′44″N 46°47′41″E
- Country: Iran
- Province: Ilam
- County: Sirvan
- Bakhsh: Central
- Rural District: Rudbar

Population (2006)
  - Total: 214
- Time zone: UTC+3:30 (IRST)
  - Summer (DST): UTC+4:30 (IRDT)

Emarat (Persian: عمارت, also Romanized as ‘Emārat) is a village in Rudbar Rural District, Central District, Sirvan County, Ilam Province, Iran. At the 2006 census, its population was 214, in 46 families. The village is populated by Kurds.
