= Vargach, Ilam =

Vargach ورگچ
- Village
- Location within Iran
- Coordinates: 33°33′05″N 46°50′00″E
- Country: Iran
- Province: Ilam
- County: Sirvan
- Bakhsh: Central
- Rural District: Lumar

Population (2006)
  - Total: 307
- Time zone: UTC+3:30 (IRST)
  - Summer (DST): UTC+4:30 (IRDT)

Vargach (Persian: ورگچ) is a village in Lumar Rural District, Central District, Sirvan County, Ilam Province, Iran. At the 2006 census, its population was 307, in 65 families. The village is populated by Kurds.
