= Cham Jangal =

Cham Jangal or Cham-e Jangal (Persian: چم جنگل) may refer to:

- Cham Jangal, Chaharmahal and Bakhtiari
- Cham Jangal, Ilam
