= Larini-ye Sofla =

Larini-ye Sofla لرني سفلي
- Village
- Location within Iran
- Coordinates: 33°35′00″N 46°46′00″E
- Country: Iran
- Province: Ilam
- County: Sirvan
- Bakhsh: Central
- Rural District: Lumar

Population (2006)
  - Total: 370
- Time zone: UTC+3:30 (IRST)
  - Summer (DST): UTC+4:30 (IRDT)

Larini-ye Sofla (Persian: لرني سفلي, also Romanized as Larīnī-ye Soflá; also known as Larīnī) is a village in Lumar Rural District, Central District, Sirvan County, Ilam Province, Iran. At the 2006 census, its population was 370, in 77 families. The village is populated by Kurds.
