= Derby dell'Enza =

Football rivalry in Italy

- Other names: Derby del Parmigiano Reggiano
- Location: Italy
- Teams: Parma; Reggiana
- First meeting: Reggiana 2–1 Parma; Promozione Emilia (7 December 1919)
- Latest meeting: Parma 0–0 Reggiana; Serie B (2 September 2023)

Statistics
- Total meetings: Competitive: 81; League: 78
- Top scorer: Parma: Unknown; Reggiana: Dimitri Pinti (4 goals)
- All-time series: Reggiana wins: 27; Draws: 27; Parma wins: 27
- Largest victory: Four Parma victories by a margin of 4 goals

The Derby dell'Enza, also referred to as the Derby del Parmigiano Reggiano, is the local derby contested by Emilian association football clubs Parma F.C. and A.C. Reggiana 1919. The name derives from the Enza river, which forms the boundary of the provinces of Parma and Reggio Emilia. The match is contested twice a year when the two clubs participate in the same league competition.

The rivalry stems from a historical rivalry between the cities of Parma and Reggio Emilia, which transcends sport. Despite the close rivalry, Parma is comfortably the more successful of the two sides, having won 8 major trophies. The first of these was as recent as the 1991–92 Coppa Italia triumph. Before the 1990s, neither side had played in Serie A, Italian football's top tier that was formed in 1929, so Parma's dominance is a recent trend. Fan violence between ultras groups is often a problem in this derby.

== History ==
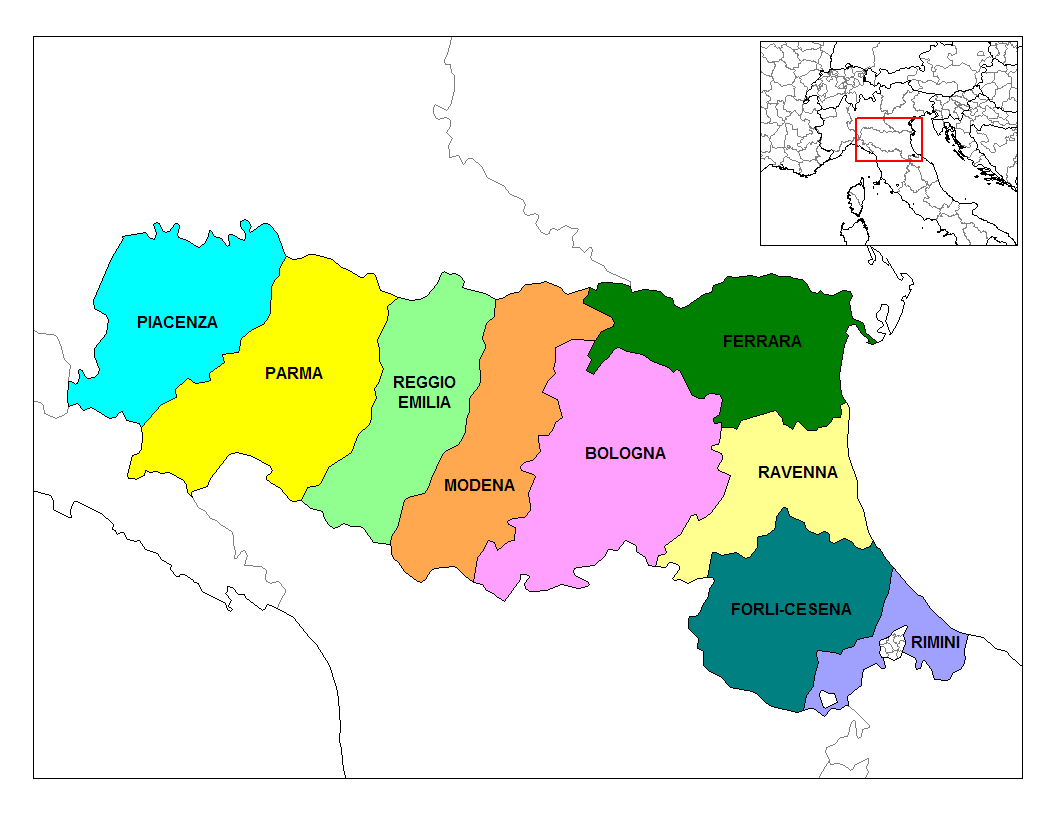
The provinces of Parma and Reggio Emilia within Emilia-Romagna

Separated by just 25 kilometres, Parma has historically been seen as a snobbish or aristocratic city, the capital of the small state Duchy of Parma and Piacenza, home to monuments, churches and palaces, and whose famous sons are musicians Giuseppe Verdi and Arturo Toscanini and painter Parmigianino, while the residents of Reggio Emilia were perceived as less affluent and hot-blooded with a strong background in agriculture, the first city to fly the Tricolore in 1797, but also excelled in the arts through the works of Ludovico Ariosto and Antonio da Correggio. The cities share the protected naming of the world-renowned Parmesan cheese, more properly called Parmigiano-Reggiano. Parma's football team was founded in 1913 and A.C. Reggiana 1919 was founded six years later in 1919. 1919 also the first year they met, as they duked it out in the Promozione and the Prima Categoria in what were both sides' first two seasons in league football from 1919 to 1921.

The two Emilian sides had six more meetings before 1930 was out, but neither side was able to win away from home. From 1932, the clubs had an unmatched run of 8 consecutive seasons of league derbies in a period in which Reggiana had the upper hand, finishing above Parma in the league every year. This trend continued across the 1940s and 1950s, although derbies did not occur so frequently over those years. For the 1952–53 Serie C campaign, Reggiana was given a 20-point deduction for misconduct denounced by the Parma management and was relegated to the ignominy of IV Serie that season. However, they returned as the 1960s neared with four seasons of Serie B contests in which the spoils were shared with three wins apiece out of eight, but Parma's relegation from that division in 1961–62 put an end to derbies until 1970.

On 18 November 1973, the derby was a goalless affair, but nonetheless notable for its on-pitch actions because of the match's three sendings-off. After coming to blows in the second half, both Sega (Parma) and Stefanello (Reggiana) were given their marching orders. Reggiana's Zandoli joined them after an off the ball incident to give the home side a man advantage. The 1973–74 Derby dell'Enza contents March 1974 also ended goalless, while the January 1976 match had the same lack of incisiveness, but ended one apiece. On the third last day of the 1974–75 Serie B season, the two sides met when they were threatened with relegation. A second half goal from Reggiana's Sileno Passalacqua was the only goal of the game and it ultimately sealed Parma's relegation fate. Reggiana would go on to avoid relegation via a spareggio against Alessandria in Milan.

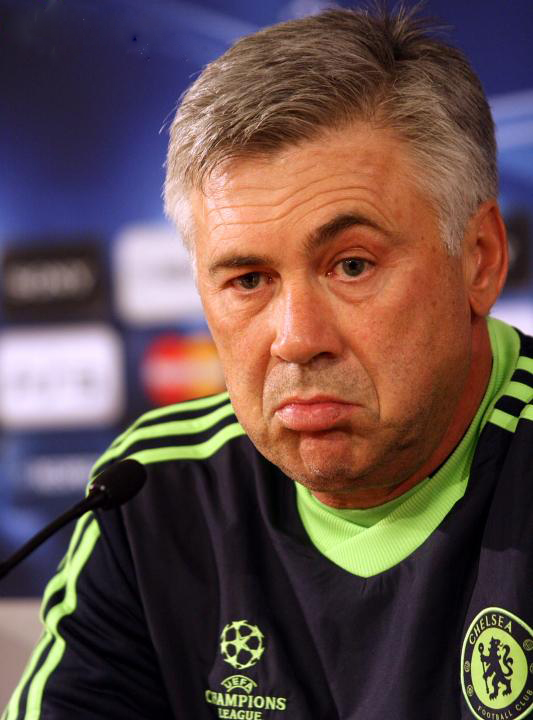
Carlo Ancelotti, the only man to manage both Reggiana and Parma, went on to win major titles with Milan and Chelsea.

In the 1989–90 Serie B season, both teams performed well, chasing promotion to Serie A. Fan trouble was caused by Parma fans in the Reggio Emilia game in late December, when they attempted to halt the train early in order to avoid police controls and also damaged locals' cars. In the match itself, Parma were superior, Maurizio Ganz scoring twice without reply. In the return match at the Tardini, Parma secured promotion to Serie A for the first time in its history. Nevio Scala's team again won the game 2–0 thanks to goals from Alessandro Melli and Marco Osio. The Parma fans' celebrations were in stark contrast to the behaviour of Reggiana's, of whom three were arrested, after cars were damaged, windows broken and Stazione di Parma was subjected to acts of vandalism. Parma had also secured a first league derby double in exactly 30 seasons, when Reggiana achieved the feat.

Serie A's first Derby dell'Enza took place on 24 October 1993, following Reggiana's summer promotion. Alessandro Melli scored the only goal of the game for a Parma team fatigued by mid-week exertions in Haifa. The return meeting on 6 March 1994 was bizarrely interrupted by a calf injury to referee Pierluigi Pairetto after just 20 minutes, meaning the match was called off at half-time and not completed until 5 April. In September 1996 at the Stadio Ennio Tardini, trouble was caused by the Ultras Ghetto, a Reggiana ultras group, as cars were vandalised and flares and firecrackers thrown into the Parma fan areas, despite a police presence of 500. The match itself was dominated by Parma, who emerged victors by three goals to two after Reggiana twice came from a goal behind to equalise before Gianfranco Zola netted the winner. In the clubs' most recent top division encounter in 1996–97 and first at the new Stadio Giglio (which had replaced the Stadio Mirabello in 1995), metal objects were thrown at Parma goalkeeper Gianluigi Buffon during the match. A gap had already opened between the fortunes of the club at a time when owner Calisto Tanzi owned Parma and sponsored Reggiana. The match finished goalless, but Parma would go on to finish in second position, which remains a club record, and Reggiana finished bottom, 18 points adrift of safety. This gap has only widened in the years since, as Reggiana has sunk two divisions below Parma.

Reggiana's good performance in the 2008–09 Lega Pro Prima Divisione, the third tier, while Parma were in Serie B, the second, raised the possibility of a 77th league derby in 2009–10, but this was extinguished when Parma won promotion back to Serie A at the first attempt and Reggiana failed to qualify from the play-offs. Because the match was not played for some years, some have called for its revival as a friendly, but the possibility was denied in the summer of 2010 due to worries about public order. Despite the relative inactivity of this derby in recent years, Reggiana has played no other side on more occasions in league football. On 19 December 2016 in Group B of the Lega Pro (soon to be renamed Serie C) and after nearly two decades without a competitive meeting, Parma won the derby with two goals at the Mapei Stadium. Parma were promoted at the end of that season and returned to Serie A a year later, being relegated in 2021, while Reggiana emerged from a bankruptcy event to climb back to Serie B, but dropped down from that level at the same time as Parma were relegated to it, postponing the resumption of the rivalry for a fifth season.

== Statistics ==
	Total						Parma at home						Reggiana at home					
	Matches	Parma wins	Draws	Reggiana wins	Parma goals	Reggiana goals	Matches	Parma wins	Draws	Reggiana wins	Parma goals	Reggiana goals	Matches	Parma wins	Draws	Reggiana wins	Parma goals	Reggiana goals
League	78	26	26	26	81	68	39	21	9	9	53	23	39	5	17	17	28	45
Coppa Italia	1	0	0	1	1	2	0	0	0	0	0	0	1	0	0	1	1	2
Coppa Italia C	2	1	1	0	1	0	1	0	1	0	0	0	1	1	0	0	1	0
Competitive	81	27	27	27	83	70	40	21	10	9	53	23	41	6	17	18	30	47
Coppa del Primato	4	1	2	1	4	4	2	0	1	1	1	2	2	1	1	0	3	2
Total	85	28	29	28	87	74	42	21	11	10	54	25	43	7	18	18	33	49

== Results ==
Parma win Draw Reggiana win

=== League ===
The listed results cover the clubs' league meetings.

==== Parma at home ====
Date	Venue	Result	Competition
19 January 1920	Stadio Ennio Tardini	3–0	Promozione
31 August 1920	Stadio Ennio Tardini	5–1	Prima Categoria
28 October 1923	Stadio Ennio Tardini	0–0	Seconda Divisione
25 October 1925	Stadio Ennio Tardini	2–0	Prima Divisione
6 March 1927	Stadio Ennio Tardini	1–0	Prima Divisione
26 January 1930	Stadio Ennio Tardini	1–0	Serie B
5 March 1933	Stadio Ennio Tardini	5–1	Prima Divisione
29 October 1933	Stadio Ennio Tardini	0–0	Prima Divisione
17 March 1935	Stadio Ennio Tardini	2–0	Prima Divisione
5 January 1936	Stadio Ennio Tardini	0–1	Serie C
3 January 1937	Stadio Ennio Tardini	1–1	Serie C
17 April 1938	Stadio Ennio Tardini	1–0	Serie C
5 February 1939	Stadio Ennio Tardini	0–0	Serie C
28 January 1940	Stadio Ennio Tardini	1–0	Serie C
9 February 1943	Stadio Ennio Tardini	4–0	Serie C
30 December 1945	Stadio Ennio Tardini	0–2	Serie B-C
25 May 1947	Stadio Ennio Tardini	4–0	Serie B
19 October 1947	Stadio Ennio Tardini	2–1	Serie B
24 October 1948	Stadio Ennio Tardini	0–2	Serie B
22 March 1953	Stadio Ennio Tardini	1–2	Serie C
19 March 1959	Stadio Ennio Tardini	1–2	Serie B
11 October 1959	Stadio Ennio Tardini	0–1	Serie B
12 February 1961	Stadio Ennio Tardini	0–1	Serie B
24 September 1961	Stadio Ennio Tardini	2–0	Serie B
29 November 1964	Stadio Ennio Tardini	3–0	Serie B
18 October 1970	Stadio Ennio Tardini	0–0	Serie C
18 November 1973	Stadio Ennio Tardini	0–0	Serie B
26 January 1975	Stadio Ennio Tardini	1–1	Serie B
23 October 1976	Stadio Ennio Tardini	2–1	Serie C
16 October 1977	Stadio Ennio Tardini	1–0	Serie C
4 March 1979	Stadio Ennio Tardini	0–1	Serie C1
16 November 1980	Stadio Ennio Tardini	0–0	Serie C1
4 December 1983	Stadio Ennio Tardini	0–0	Serie C1
4 May 1986	Stadio Ennio Tardini	1–2	Serie C1
27 May 1990	Stadio Ennio Tardini	2–0	Serie B
24 October 1993	Stadio Ennio Tardini	1–0	Serie A
23 October 1994	Stadio Ennio Tardini	2–1	Serie A
21 September 1996	Stadio Ennio Tardini	3–2	Serie A
7 May 2017	Stadio Ennio Tardini	1–0	Lega Pro
2 September 2023	Stadio Ennio Tardini	0–0	Serie B

==== Reggiana at home ====
Date	Venue	Result	Competition
7 December 1919	Stadio Mirabello	2–1	Promozione
23 January 1921	Stadio Mirabello	3–2	Prima Categoria
23 December 1923	Stadio Mirabello	2–0	Seconda Divisione
28 March 1926	Stadio Mirabello	2–0	Prima Divisione
22 November 1926	Stadio Mirabello	2–0	Prima Divisione
15 June 1930	Stadio Mirabello	2–2	Serie B
6 November 1932	Stadio Mirabello	1–1	Prima Divisione
18 February 1934	Stadio Mirabello	2–0	Prima Divisione
4 November 1934	Stadio Mirabello	0–0	Prima Divisione
3 May 1936	Stadio Mirabello	2–0	Serie C
9 May 1937	Stadio Mirabello	2–2	Serie C
2 January 1938	Stadio Mirabello	1–1	Serie C
9 October 1938	Stadio Mirabello	1–0	Serie C
24 September 1939	Stadio Mirabello	0–1	Serie C
18 October 1942	Stadio Mirabello	2–2	Serie C
30 December 1945	Stadio Mirabello	0–1	Serie B-C
29 December 1946	Stadio Mirabello	1–0	Serie B
21 March 1948	Stadio Mirabello	0–0	Serie B
6 March 1949	Stadio Mirabello	1–1	Serie B
16 November 1952	Stadio Mirabello	1–0	Serie C
2 November 1958	Stadio Mirabello	1–0	Serie B
28 February 1960	Stadio Mirabello	3–1	Serie B
2 October 1960	Stadio Mirabello	1–1	Serie B
18 February 1962	Stadio Mirabello	1–1	Serie B
25 April 1965	Stadio Mirabello	0–0	Serie B
7 March 1971	Stadio Mirabello	1–0	Serie C
31 March 1974	Stadio Mirabello	0–0	Serie B
8 June 1975	Stadio Mirabello	1–0	Serie B
13 March 1977	Stadio Mirabello	0–0	Serie C
5 March 1978	Stadio Mirabello	2–0	Serie C
29 October 1978	Stadio Mirabello	0–0	Serie C1
29 March 1981	Stadio Mirabello	2–1	Serie C1
29 April 1984	Stadio Mirabello	1–1	Serie C1
15 December 1985	Stadio Mirabello	1–3	Serie C1
30 December 1989	Stadio Mirabello	0–2	Serie B
6 March 1994	Stadio Mirabello	2–0	Serie A
19 March 1995	Stadio Mirabello	2–2	Serie A
16 February 1997	Stadio Città del Tricolore	0–0	Serie A
19 December 2016	Stadio Città del Tricolore	0–2	Lega Pro

|}

=== Cup ===
==== Coppa Italia ====
The two clubs have met just once in the Coppa Italia and Reggiana won the game 2–1, scoring the winning goal in extra time.

Date	Venue	Result
11 September 1938	Stadio Mirabello	2–1 (a.e.t.)

==== Coppa Italia Semiprofessionisti ====
Parma had the better of the two meetings in the Coppa Italia Semiprofessionisti. The sides met in Group 15 of the preliminary round.

Date	Venue	Result
25 August 1976	Stadio Mirabello	0–1
5 September 1976	Stadio Ennio Tardini	0–0

=== Other competitions ===
Parma and Reggiana also played each other in the Coppa del Primato on 4 occasions:

Date	Result
6 May 1934	0–1
9 May 1934	0–1
29 December 1934	2–2
1 January 1935	1–1

== Shared personnel ==
=== Players ===
A number of players have played for both clubs over the course of their careers. This is an incomplete list of players who have made at least one appearance for both:

- (Italy) Armando Anastasio
- (Italy) Luigi Apolloni
- (Italy) Fabio Aselli
- (Italy) Alessio Badari
- (Italy) Mattia Bani
- (Italy) Marco Ballotta
- (Italy) Gianluca Berti
- (Italy) Enzo Bertoli
- (Italy) Alfonso Bertozzi
- (Italy) Giovanni Bia
- (Italy) Pietro Biagini
- (Italy) Fabio Bonci
- (Italy) Lamberto Boranga
- (Italy) Massimo Brambilla
- (Italy) Luca Bucci
- (Italy) Ottorino Casanova
- (Italy) Tarcisio Catanese
- (Italy) Luca Cigarini
- (Italy) Andrea Costa
- (Italy) Giovanni Rasia Dal Polo
- (Italy) Franco Deasti
- (Italy) Alberto Di Chiara
- (Italy) Pierluigi Di Già
- (Italy) Costantino Fava
- (Italy) Marco Ferrante
- (Italy) Alessandro Fornasaris
- (Italy) Augusto Gabriele
- (Italy) Andrea Galassi
- (Italy) Enzo Gambaro
- (Italy) Luca Germoni
- (Belgium) Georges Grün
- (Italy) Fabrizio Larini
- (Italy) Mario Lemme
- (Italy) Venuto Lombatti
- (Italy) Marco Macina
- (Italy) Roberto Magnani
- (Italy) Giovanni Manfrinato
- (Italy) Marco Marocchi
- (Italy) Renato Martini
- (Italy) Davide Matteini
- (Italy) Giovanni Meregalli
- (Italy) Adile Montanari
- (Italy) Enrico Morello
- (Italy) Enea Moruzzi
- (Italy) Stefano Nava
- (Italy) Olmes Neri
- (Italy) Roberto Paci
- (Italy) Roberto Parlanti
- (Italy) Renato Piccoli
- (Italy) Dimitri Pinti
- (Italy) Fausto Pizzi
- (Italy) Renzo Ragonesi
- (Italy) Orazio Rancati
- (Italy) Alberto Rizzati
- (Italy) Stefano Rossini
- (Italy) Francesco Ruopolo
- (Italy) Luigi Sartor
- (Italy) Luca Siligardi
- (Italy) Davide Sinigaglia
- (Italy) Silvio Smersy
- (Italy) Livio Spaggiari
- (Italy) Mattia Sprocati
- (Italy) Pietro Strada
- (Brazil) Cláudio Taffarel
- (Italy) Stefano Torrisi
- (Italy) Antonio Junior Vacca
- (Italy) Giorgio Visconti
- (Italy) Carlo Volpi
- (Italy) Davide Zannoni
- (Italy) Otello Zironi
- (Italy) Sergio Zuccheri

=== Head coaches ===
Only two coach has taken charge of both Derby dell'Enza outfits: Carlo Ancelotti and Luigi Apolloni. In 1995, Ancelotti took his first job in management at Serie B side Reggiana, where he led the team to fourth position and promotion to Serie A. In the summer of 1996, he moved directly to fellow Serie A team Parma to replace the club's all-time most successful coach, Nevio Scala. Parma finished in second position in his first year in charge, which remains a record high league finish for the Ducali, and fifth position in his second and final season. Apolloni played for both clubs in his professional career, then briefly managed Reggiana in the 2012-13 season, where he was appointed mid-season in the 3rd tier and sacked after 9 games. In the 2015-16 he managed Parma, gaining promotion from Serie D to Serie C. He was sacked the following season after 14 games.

Head coach	Reggiana career								Parma career							
Head coach	Span	G	W	D	L	F	A	Win %	Span	G	W	D	L	F	A	Win %
(Italy) Carlo Ancelotti	1995–1996	41	17	14	10	45	36	41.46	1996–1998	87	42	27	18	114	85	48.28
(Italy) Luigi Apolloni	2012–2013	9	2	1	6	5	16	22.22	2015–2016	58	37	16	5	112	42	63.79

== See also ==
- Parma F.C.
- A.C. Reggiana 1919
- List of association football club rivalries by country
