= Heyvand =

Heyvand هيوند
- Village
- Location within Iran
- Coordinates: 33°33′25″N 46°45′33″E
- Country: Iran
- Province: Ilam
- County: Sirvan
- Bakhsh: Central
- Rural District: Lumar

Population (2006)
  - Total: 172
- Time zone: UTC+3:30 (IRST)
  - Summer (DST): UTC+4:30 (IRDT)

Heyvand (Persian: هيوند; also known as Shāhīvand) is a village in Lumar Rural District, Central District, Sirvan County, Ilam Province, Iran. At the 2006 census, its population was 172, in 33 families. The village is populated by Kurds.
