= Sarkan, Ilam =

Sarkan سركان
- Village
- Location within Iran
- Coordinates: 33°32′46″N 46°50′13″E
- Country: Iran
- Province: Ilam
- County: Sirvan
- Bakhsh: Central
- Rural District: Rudbar

Population (2006)
  - Total: 109
- Time zone: UTC+3:30 (IRST)
  - Summer (DST): UTC+4:30 (IRDT)

Sarkan (Persian: سركان, also Romanized as Sarkān and Serkān) is a village in Rudbar Rural District, Central District, Sirvan County, Ilam Province, Iran. At the 2006 census, its population was 109, in 18 families. The village is populated by Kurds.
