= Cheshmeh Chai-ye Olya =

Cheshmeh Chai-ye Olya چشمه چاي عليا
- Village
- Location within Iran
- Coordinates: 33°41′09″N 46°33′28″E
- Country: Iran
- Province: Ilam
- County: Sirvan
- Bakhsh: Karezan
- Rural District: Karezan

Population (2006)
  - Total: 15
- Time zone: UTC+3:30 (IRST)
  - Summer (DST): UTC+4:30 (IRDT)

Cheshmeh Chai-ye Olya (Persian: چشمه چاي عليا, also Romanized as Cheshmeh Chāī-ye ‘Olyā; also known as Cheshmeh Chāhī-ye ‘Olyā) is a village in Karezan Rural District, Karezan District, Sirvan County, Ilam Province, Iran. At the 2006 census, its population was 15, in 4 families. The village is populated by Kurds.
