= Qanatabad =

Qanatabad (Persian: قنات اباد) may refer to:

- Qanatabad, Ilam
- Qanatabad, Lorestan
