= Qazi Khan-e Olya =

Village in Ilam, Iran

Qazi Khan-e Olya قاضي خان عليا
- Village
- Location within Iran
- Coordinates: 33°28′06″N 46°54′41″E
- Country: Iran
- Province: Ilam
- County: Sirvan
- Bakhsh: Central
- Rural District: Rudbar

Population (2006)
  - Total: 148
- Time zone: UTC+3:30 (IRST)
  - Summer (DST): UTC+4:30 (IRDT)

Qazi Khan-e Olya (Persian: قاضي خان عليا, also Romanized as Qāẕī Khān-e ‘Olyā; also known as Qāzī Khānī) is a village in Rudbar Rural District, Central District, Sirvan County, Ilam Province, Iran. At the 2006 census, its population was 148, in 30 families. The village is populated by Kurds.
