= Eslamiyeh, Ilam =

Village in Ilam province, Iran

Eslamiyeh Persian: اسلاميه
- Village
- Location within Iran Location within Ilam Province
- Coordinates: 33°34′27″N 46°47′07″E
- Country: Iran
- Province: Ilam
- County: Sirvan
- District: Central
- Rural District: Lumar

Population (2016)
  - Total: 347
- Time zone: UTC+3:30 (IRST)

Eslamiyeh (Persian: اسلاميه) (Note: Also romanized as Eslāmīyeh; also known as Shāh Eyvān Cheshmeh-ye Chāhī, Shāhīvānd, and Shāhīvān-e Cheshmeh Shāhī) is a village in Lumar Rural District of the Central District of Sirvan County, Ilam province, Iran.

== Demographics ==
=== Ethnicity ===
The village is populated by Kurds.

=== Population ===
At the time of the 2006 National Census, the village's population was 364 in 81 households, when it was in the former Shirvan District of Chardavol County. (Note: Formerly Shirvan and Chardavol County) The following census in 2011 counted 250 people in 66 households. The 2016 census measured the population of the village as 347 people in 104 households, by which time the district had been separated from the county in the establishment of Sirvan County. The rural district was transferred to the new Central District. It was the most populous village in its rural district.
