= Qazi Khan-e Sofla =

Qazi Khan-e Sofla قاضي خان سفلي
- Village
- Location within Iran
- Coordinates: 33°27′14″N 46°54′59″E
- Country: Iran
- Province: Ilam
- County: Sirvan
- Bakhsh: Central
- Rural District: Rudbar

Population (2006)
  - Total: 319
- Time zone: UTC+3:30 (IRST)
  - Summer (DST): UTC+4:30 (IRDT)

Qazi Khan-e Sofla (Persian: قاضي خان سفلي, also Romanized as Qāẕī Khān-e Soflá; also known as Qāẕī Khān) is a village in Rudbar Rural District, Central District, Sirvan County, Ilam Province, Iran. At the 2006 census, its population was 319, in 67 families. The village is populated by Kurds.
