= Sarkun =

Sarkun (Persian: سركون) may refer to:

- Sarkun-e Biseytun
- Sarkun-e Olya

== See also ==
- Sarkan (disambiguation)
- A. Sarkunam (born 1975), Indian film director, screenwriter and film producer
