= Cheshmeh Chai-ye Vosta =

Cheshmeh Chai-ye Vosta چشمه چاي وسطي
- Village
- Location within Iran
- Coordinates: 33°40′49″N 46°33′29″E
- Country: Iran
- Province: Ilam
- County: Sirvan
- Bakhsh: Karezan
- Rural District: Karezan

Population (2006)
  - Total: 80
- Time zone: UTC+3:30 (IRST)
  - Summer (DST): UTC+4:30 (IRDT)

Cheshmeh Chai-ye Vosta (Persian: چشمه چاي وسطي, also Romanized as Cheshmeh Chāī-ye Vosţá; also known as Cheshmeh Chāhī-ye Vosţá) is a village in Karezan Rural District, Karezan District, Sirvan County, Ilam Province, Iran. At the 2006 census, its population was 80, in 17 families. The village is populated by Kurds.
