= Qazi Khan, Ilam =

Qazi Khan, Ilam may refer to:

- Qazi Khan-e Olya
- Qazi Khan-e Sofla
