= Larini-ye Olya =

Larini-ye Olya لرني عليا
- Village
- Location within Iran
- Coordinates: 33°34′41″N 46°45′25″E
- Country: Iran
- Province: Ilam
- County: Sirvan
- Bakhsh: Central
- Rural District: Lumar

Population (2006)
  - Total: 226
- Time zone: UTC+3:30 (IRST)
  - Summer (DST): UTC+4:30 (IRDT)

Larini-ye Olya (Persian: لرني عليا, also Romanized as Larīnī-ye ‘Olyā; also known as Barāftāb-e Larīnī and Larīnī) is a village in Lumar Rural District, Central District, Sirvan County, Ilam Province, Iran. At the 2006 census, its population was 226, in 45 families. The village is populated by Kurds.
