= Larini =

Larini is an Italian surname. Notable people with the surname include:

- Andrea Larini (born 1968), Italian racing driver
- Fabrizio Larini (born 1953), Italian sporting director
- Nicola Larini (born 1964), Italian racing driver

== See also ==
- Larini, Iran (disambiguation)
- Larrini, a tribe of Crabronid wasps
