= Zoheyri =

Zoheyri (Persian: ظهيري) may refer to:

- Zoheyri-ye Olya
- Zoheyri-ye Sofla
