= Cheshmeh Pahn, Ilam =

Neighborhood in Ilam province, Iran

Cheshmeh Pahn Persian: چشمه پهن
- Neighborhood
- Location within Iran Location within Ilam Province
- Coordinates: 33°43′55″N 46°31′51″E
- Country: Iran
- Province: Ilam
- County: Sirvan
- District: Karezan
- Rural District: Karezan
- Village: Karezan

Population (2016)
  - Total: 408
- Time zone: UTC+3:30 (IRST)

Cheshmeh Pahn (Persian: چشمه پهن) is a neighborhood in the village of Karezan in Karezan Rural District of Karezan District in Sirvan County, Ilam province, Iran. As a village it served as capital of both the district and the rural district.

== Demographics ==
=== Ethnicity ===
The village is populated by Kurds.

=== Population ===
At the time of the 2006 National Census, Cheshmeh Pahn's population was 313 in 66 households, when it was a village in Karezan Rural District of the former Shirvan District in Chardavol County. (Note: Formerly Shirvan and Chardavol County) The following census in 2011 counted 326 people in 87 households. The 2016 census measured the population of the village as 408 people in 117 households, by which time the district had been separated from the county in the establishment of Sirvan County. The rural district was transferred to the new Karezan District.

In 2023, the villages of Cheshmeh Pahn and Cheshmeh Rashid were merged to form the village of Karezan.
