= Cham-e Shir, Ilam =

Village in Ilam, Iran

Cham-e Shir چم شير
- Village
- Location within Iran
- Coordinates: 33°26′03″N 46°59′37″E
- Country: Iran
- Province: Ilam
- County: Sirvan
- Bakhsh: Central
- Rural District: Rudbar

Population (2006)
  - Total: 520
- Time zone: UTC+3:30 (IRST)
  - Summer (DST): UTC+4:30 (IRDT)

Cham-e Shir (Persian: چم شير, also Romanized as Cham-e Shīr and Cham Shīr; also known as Cham-e Zavīyeh) is a village in Rudbar Rural District, Central District, Sirvan County, Ilam Province, Iran. At the 2006 census, its population was 520, in 109 families. The village is populated by Arabs.
