= Negel, Ilam =

Negel نگل
- Village
- Location within Iran
- Coordinates: 33°34′00″N 46°45′00″E
- Country: Iran
- Province: Ilam
- County: Sirvan
- Bakhsh: Central
- Rural District: Lumar

Population (2006)
  - Total: 212
- Time zone: UTC+3:30 (IRST)
  - Summer (DST): UTC+4:30 (IRDT)

Negel (Persian: نگل) is a village in Lumar Rural District, Central District, Sirvan County, Ilam Province, Iran. At the 2006 census, its population was 212, in 38 families. The village is populated by Kurds.
