= Amarat =

Amarat may refer to:

- Al Amarat, Oman
- Emarat, Iran (disambiguation)
- Al Amarat, Khartoum, Sudan
