= Cham Jangal, Chaharmahal and Bakhtiari =

Cham Jangal چم جنگل
- Village
- Location within Iran
- Coordinates: 32°31′20″N 50°51′24″E
- Country: Iran
- Province: Chaharmahal and Bakhtiari
- County: Saman
- Rural District: Saman

Population (2006)
  - Total: 221
- Time zone: UTC+3:30 (IRST)
  - Summer (DST): UTC+4:30 (IRDT)

Cham Jangal (Persian: چم جنگل, also Romanized as Cham-e Jangal) is a village in Saman Rural District, Saman County, Chaharmahal and Bakhtiari Province, Iran. At the 2006 census, its population was 221, in 58 families. The village is populated by Turkic people.
