= Vargach =

Vargach (Persian: ورگچ) may refer to:

- Vargach, Ilam
- Vargach, Kermanshah
