= Negel =

Negel may refer to the following places:

- Negel, Ilam, Iran
- Negel, Kurdistan, Iran
- Negel Rural District, in Kurdistan Province, Iran
- Negel (river), a tributary of the Trebeș in eastern Romania
