= Zarrin Rural District (Saman County) =

Rural district in Chaharmahal and Bakhtiari province, Iran

Zarrin Rural District Persian: دهستان زرین
- Rural District
- Location within Iran
- Coordinates: 32°40′N 50°50′E
- Country: Iran
- Province: Chaharmahal and Bakhtiari
- County: Saman
- District: Zayandehrud
- Established: 2013
- Capital: Garmdarreh

Population (2016)
  - Total: 3,769
- Time zone: UTC+3:30 (IRST)

Zarrin Rural District (Persian: دهستان زرین) is in Zayandehrud District of Saman County, Chaharmahal and Bakhtiari province, Iran. Its capital is the village of Garmdarreh.

== History ==
In 2013, Saman District was separated from Shahrekord County in the establishment of Saman County, and Zarrin Rural District was created in the new Zayandehrud District.

== Demographics ==
=== Population ===
At the time of the 2016 National Census, the rural district's population was 3,769 in 1,226 households. The most populous of its four villages was Markdeh, with 1,601 people.

=== Other villages in the rural district ===
- Qaraqush
- Quchan
