= Chama Rural District =

Rural district in Chaharmahal and Bakhtiari province, Iran

Chama Rural District Persian: دهستان چما
- Rural District
- Location within Iran
- Coordinates: 32°31′N 50°54′E
- Country: Iran
- Province: Chaharmahal and Bakhtiari
- County: Saman
- District: Central
- Established: 2013
- Capital: Cham Chang

Population (2016)
  - Total: 4,784
- Time zone: UTC+3:30 (IRST)

Chama Rural District (Persian: دهستان چما) is in the Central District of Saman County, Chaharmahal and Bakhtiari province, Iran. Its capital is the village of Cham Chang.

== History ==
In 2013, Saman District was separated from Shahrekord County in the establishment of Saman County, and Chama Rural District was created in the new Central District.

== Demographics ==
=== Population ===
At the time of the 2016 National Census, the rural district's population was 4,784 in 1,509 households. The most populous of its six villages was Cham Chang, with 1,881 people.

=== Other villages in the rural district ===
- Cham Khalifeh
- Cham-e Ali
- Cham-e Zin
