= Cham-e Shir =

Cham-e Shir or Cham-i-Shir or Cham Shir (Persian: چم شير) may refer to:

- Cham-e Shir, Ilam
- Cham-i-Shir, Lorestan
