= Larini, Iran =

Larini (Persian: لرني) may refer to:

- Larini-ye Olya
- Larini-ye Sofla
