= Hureh, Chaharmahal and Bakhtiari =

City in Chaharmahal and Bakhtiari province, Iran

Hureh Persian: هوره
- City
- Location within Iran
- Coordinates: 32°33′40″N 50°51′14″E
- Country: Iran
- Province: Chaharmahal and Bakhtiari
- County: Saman
- District: Zayandehrud
- Established as a city: 2017

Population (2016)
  - Total: 2,548
- Time zone: UTC+3:30 (IRST)

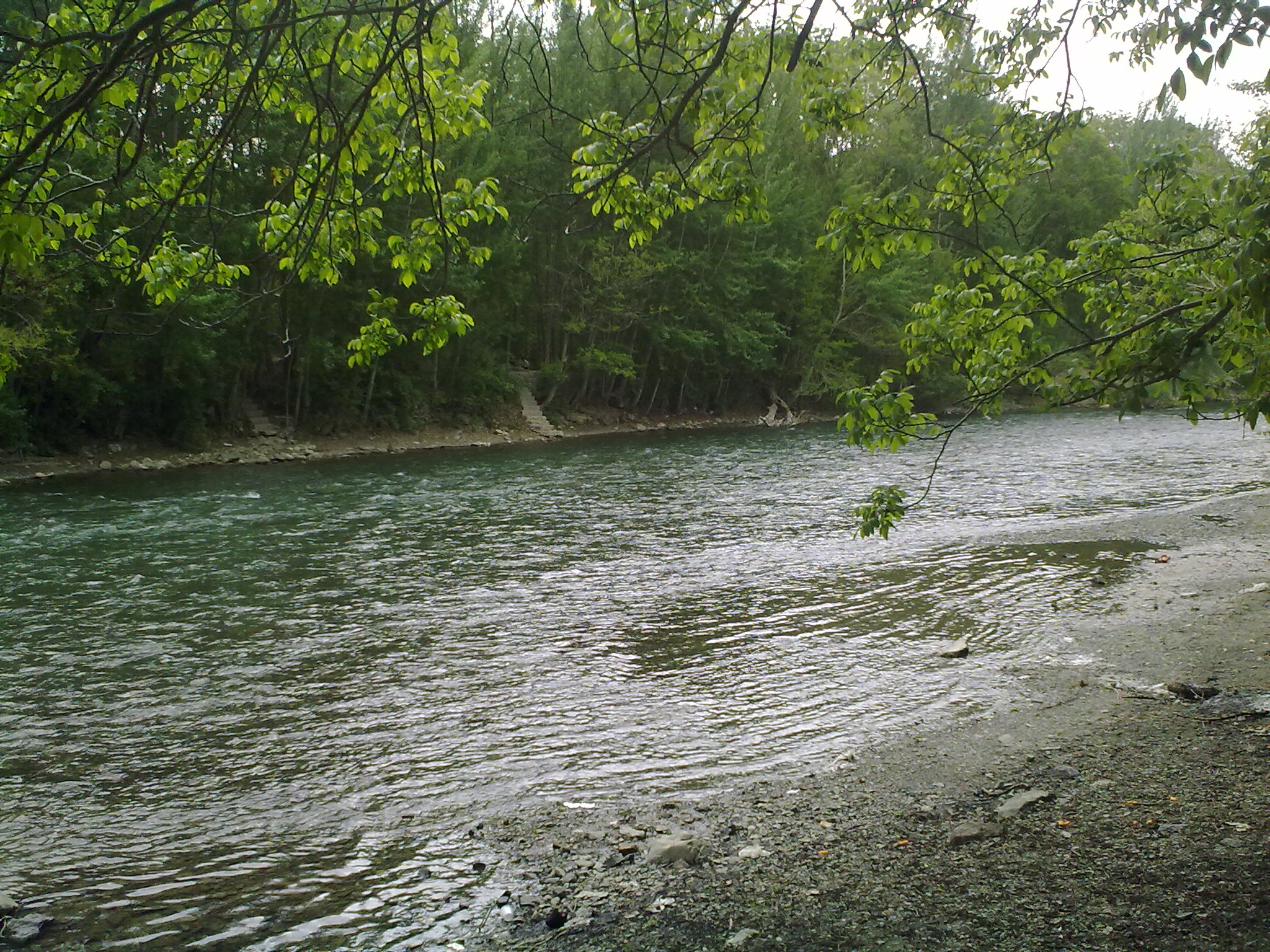
Zayandeh Rud, Horeh. In Shahrekord area of Chaharmahal-o-Bakhtiari province - Iran.

Hureh (Persian: هوره) (Note: Also romanized as Hūreh; also known as Hora) is a city in, and the capital of, Zayandehrud District in Saman County, Chaharmahal and Bakhtiari province, Iran. It also serves as the administrative center for Hureh Rural District.

== Demographics ==
=== Ethnicity ===
The city is populated by Turkic people.

=== Population ===
At the time of the 2006 National Census, Hureh's population was 2,829 in 794 households, when it was a village in Hureh Rural District of the former Saman District in Shahrekord County. The following census in 2011 counted 2,629 people in 836 households. The 2016 census measured the population of the village as 2,548 people in 814 households, by which time the district had been separated from the county in the establishment of Saman County. The rural district was transferred to the new Zayandehrud District. It was the most populous village in its rural district.

Hureh was converted to a city in 2017.
