= Emarat, Kohgiluyeh and Boyer-Ahmad =

Emarat عمارت
- Village
- Location within Iran
- Coordinates: 30°57′28″N 50°38′14″E
- Country: Iran
- Province: Kohgiluyeh and Boyer-Ahmad
- County: Kohgiluyeh
- Bakhsh: Central
- Rural District: Doshman Ziari

Population (2006)
  - Total: 132
- Time zone: UTC+3:30 (IRST)
  - Summer (DST): UTC+4:30 (IRDT)

Emarat (Persian: عمارت, also Romanized as ‘Emārat and Amārat) is a village in Doshman Ziari Rural District, in the Central District of Kohgiluyeh County, Kohgiluyeh and Boyer-Ahmad Province, Iran. At the 2006 census, its population was 132, in 28 families.
