= Baqeleh, Kermanshah =

Baqeleh باقله
- Village
- Location within Iran
- Coordinates: 34°16′01″N 47°06′43″E
- Country: Iran
- Province: Kermanshah
- County: Kermanshah
- Bakhsh: Central
- Rural District: Qarah Su

Population (2006)
  - Total: 163
- Time zone: UTC+3:30 (IRST)
  - Summer (DST): UTC+4:30 (IRDT)

Baqeleh (Persian: باقله, also Romanized as Bāqeleh; also known as Bāgeleh and Baghla) is a village in Qarah Su Rural District, in the Central District of Kermanshah County, Kermanshah Province, Iran. At the 2006 census, its population was 163, in 34 families.
