= Sarkan-e Sofla =

Sarkan-e Sofla سركان سفلي
- Village
- Location within Iran
- Coordinates: 31°47′01″N 49°47′30″E
- Country: Iran
- Province: Khuzestan
- County: Izeh
- Bakhsh: Central
- Rural District: Holayjan

Population (2006)
  - Total: 27
- Time zone: UTC+3:30 (IRST)
  - Summer (DST): UTC+4:30 (IRDT)

Sarkan-e Sofla (Persian: سركان سفلي, also Romanized as Sarkān-e Soflá; also known as Sarkān-e Pā‘īn) is a village in Holayjan Rural District, in the Central District of Izeh County, Khuzestan Province, Iran. At the 2006 census, its population was 27, in 4 families.
