= Baqeleh-ye Sofla =

Village in Kermanshah, Iran

Baqeleh-ye Sofla باقله سفلي
- Village
- Location within Iran
- Coordinates: 34°52′45″N 47°09′21″E
- Country: Iran
- Province: Kermanshah
- County: Sonqor
- Bakhsh: Kolyai
- Rural District: Kivanat

Population (2006)
  - Total: 91
- Time zone: UTC+3:30 (IRST)
  - Summer (DST): UTC+4:30 (IRDT)

Baqeleh-ye Sofla (Persian: باقله سفلي, also Romanized as Bāqeleh-ye Soflá; also known as Bāgheleh-ye Pā’īn, Baghla Pain, Bāghleh, Bāghleh-ye Pā’īn, Bāghleh-ye Soflá, and Bāqeleh-ye Pā’īn) is a village in Kivanat Rural District, Kolyai District, Sonqor County, Kermanshah Province, Iran. At the 2006 census, its population was 91, in 23 families.
