= Qanatabad, Lorestan =

Qanatabad قنات اباد
- Village
- Location within Iran
- Coordinates: 33°27′00″N 48°31′00″E
- Country: Iran
- Province: Lorestan
- County: Khorramabad
- Bakhsh: Central
- Rural District: Dehpir

Population (2006)
  - Total: 371
- Time zone: UTC+3:30 (IRST)
  - Summer (DST): UTC+4:30 (IRDT)

Qanatabad (Persian: قنات اباد, also Romanized as Qanātābād) is a village in Dehpir Rural District, in the Central District of Khorramabad County, Lorestan Province, Iran. At the 2006 census, its population was 371, in 96 families.
