= Amarat, Kermanshah =

Amarat عمارت
- Village
- Location within Iran
- Coordinates: 34°22′47″N 47°37′42″E
- Country: Iran
- Province: Kermanshah
- County: Sahneh
- Bakhsh: Central
- Rural District: Gamasiyab

Population (2006)
  - Total: 152
- Time zone: UTC+3:30 (IRST)
  - Summer (DST): UTC+4:30 (IRDT)

Amarat (Persian: عمارت, also Romanized as ‘Amārat and ‘Emārāt) is a village in Gamasiyab Rural District, in the Central District of Sahneh County, Kermanshah Province, Iran. At the 2006 census, its population was 152, in 39 families.
