= Saman, Chaharmahal and Bakhtiari =

City in Chaharmahal and Bakhtiari province, Iran

Saman Persian: سامان
- City
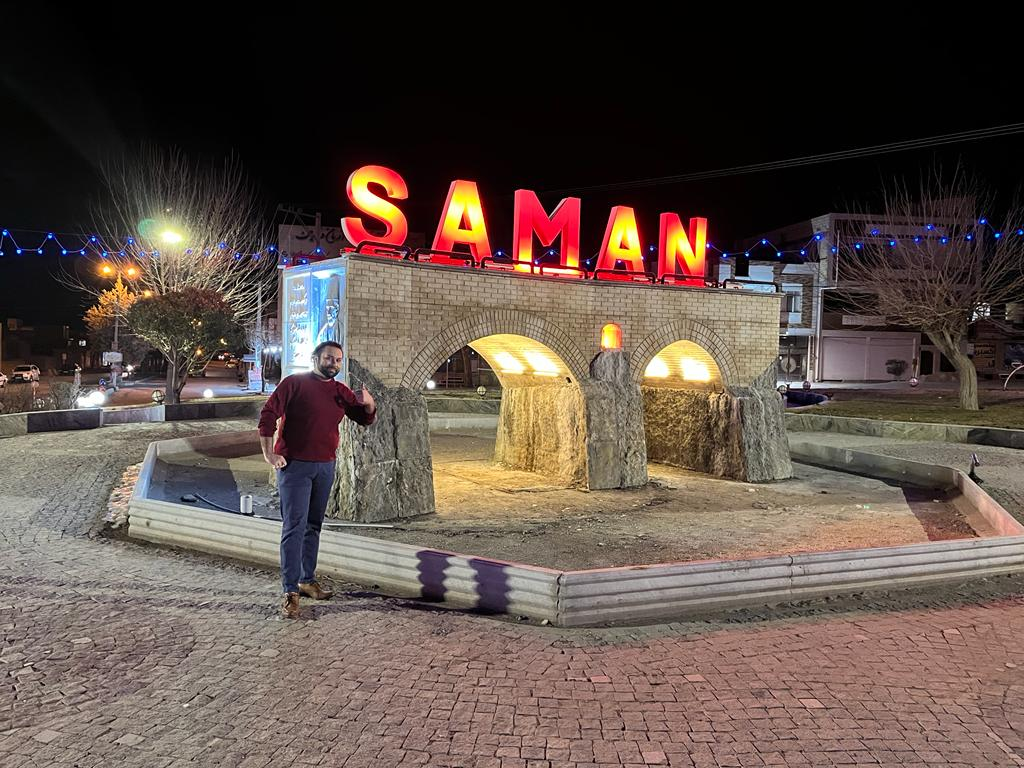
- Entrance to the city of Saman at night

- Location within Iran
- Coordinates: 32°27′00″N 50°54′39″E
- Country: Iran
- Province: Chaharmahal and Bakhtiari
- County: Saman
- District: Central

Population (2016)
  - Total: 14,192
- Time zone: UTC+3:30 (IRST)

Saman (Persian: سامان) (Note: Also romanized as Sāmān) is a city in the Central District of Saman County, Chaharmahal and Bakhtiari province, Iran, serving as capital of both the county and the district.

== Demographics ==
=== Ethnicity ===
The city is populated by Turkic people with a Persian minority.

=== Population ===
At the time of the 2006 National Census, the city's population was 14,777 in 3,961 households, when it was capital of the former Saman District in Shahrekord County. The following census in 2011 counted 15,327 people in 4,558 households. The 2016 census measured the population of the city as 14,192 people in 4,554 households, by which time the district had been separated from the county in the establishment of Saman County. Saman was transferred to the new Central District as the county's capital.

== Climate ==
Climate data for Saman (2001-2013 normals and extremes)
Month	Jan	Feb	Mar	Apr	May	Jun	Jul	Aug	Sep	Oct	Nov	Dec	Year
Record high °C (°F)	16 (61)	18 (64)	27 (81)	27 (81)	32 (90)	37 (99)	37 (99)	38 (100)	35 (95)	28 (82)	23 (73)	20 (68)	38 (100)
Mean daily maximum °C (°F)	5 (41)	9 (48)	15 (59)	19 (66)	25 (77)	31 (88)	33 (91)	32 (90)	29 (84)	23 (73)	14 (57)	8 (46)	20 (68)
Daily mean °C (°F)	0 (32)	3 (37)	8 (46)	12 (54)	17 (63)	23 (73)	25 (77)	24 (75)	21 (70)	15 (59)	8 (46)	3 (37)	13 (56)
Mean daily minimum °C (°F)	−5 (23)	−2 (28)	2 (36)	6 (43)	10 (50)	14 (57)	17 (63)	16 (61)	13 (55)	8 (46)	2 (36)	−3 (27)	7 (44)
Record low °C (°F)	−22 (−8)	−16 (3)	−10 (14)	−3 (27)	2 (36)	8 (46)	4 (39)	10 (50)	3 (37)	−2 (28)	−8 (18)	−18 (0)	−22 (−8)
Average precipitation mm (inches)	57 (2.2)	56 (2.2)	53 (2.1)	52 (2.0)	10 (0.4)	1 (0.0)	0 (0)	0 (0)	1 (0.0)	6 (0.2)	57 (2.2)	62 (2.4)	355 (13.7)
Average relative humidity (%)	59	50	38	40	31	22	21	21	21	31	48	55	36
Mean monthly sunshine hours	217	220	250	236	298	349	346	341	312	275	211	202	3,257
Source: Chaharmahalmet
