= Emarat, Rostam =

Emarat عمارت
- Village
- Location within Iran
- Coordinates: 30°20′52″N 51°23′35″E
- Country: Iran
- Province: Fars
- County: Rostam
- Bakhsh: Central
- Rural District: Rostam-e Do

Population (2006)
  - Total: 134
- Time zone: UTC+3:30 (IRST)
  - Summer (DST): UTC+4:30 (IRDT)

Emarat (Persian: عمارت, also Romanized as 'Emārat) is a village in Rostam-e Do Rural District, in the Central District of Rostam County, Fars province, Iran. At the 2006 census, its population was 134, in 28 families.
