= Shahivand Ali Morad =

Shahivand Ali Morad شاهيوند علي مراد
- Village
- Location within Iran
- Coordinates: 33°35′23″N 46°51′48″E
- Country: Iran
- Province: Lorestan
- County: Kuhdasht
- Bakhsh: Kunani
- Rural District: Zirtang

Population (2006)
  - Total: 33
- Time zone: UTC+3:30 (IRST)
  - Summer (DST): UTC+4:30 (IRDT)

Shahivand Ali Morad (Persian: شاهيوند علي مراد, also Romanized as Shāhīvand ʿAlī Morād; also known as Shāhīvand) is a village in Zirtang Rural District, Kunani District, Kuhdasht County, Lorestan Province, Iran. At the 2006 census, its population was 33, in 7 families.
