= Hureh, Khuzestan =

Hureh هوره
- Village
- Location within Iran
- Coordinates: 31°32′00″N 49°40′00″E
- Country: Iran
- Province: Khuzestan
- County: Bagh-e Malek
- Bakhsh: Central
- Rural District: Rud Zard

Population (2006)
  - Total: 105
- Time zone: UTC+3:30 (IRST)
  - Summer (DST): UTC+4:30 (IRDT)

Hureh (Persian: هوره, also Romanized as Hūreh) is a village in Rud Zard Rural District, in the Central District of Bagh-e Malek County, Khuzestan Province, Iran. At the 2006 census, its population was 105, in 18 families.
