= Stadio Mirabello =

Stadio Mirabello [miraˈbɛllo] is a 1912- multi-use stadium in Reggio Emilia, Italy. It was used mostly for football matches and hosted the home matches of A.C. Reggiana. until they moved to the Stadio Giglio in 1995.

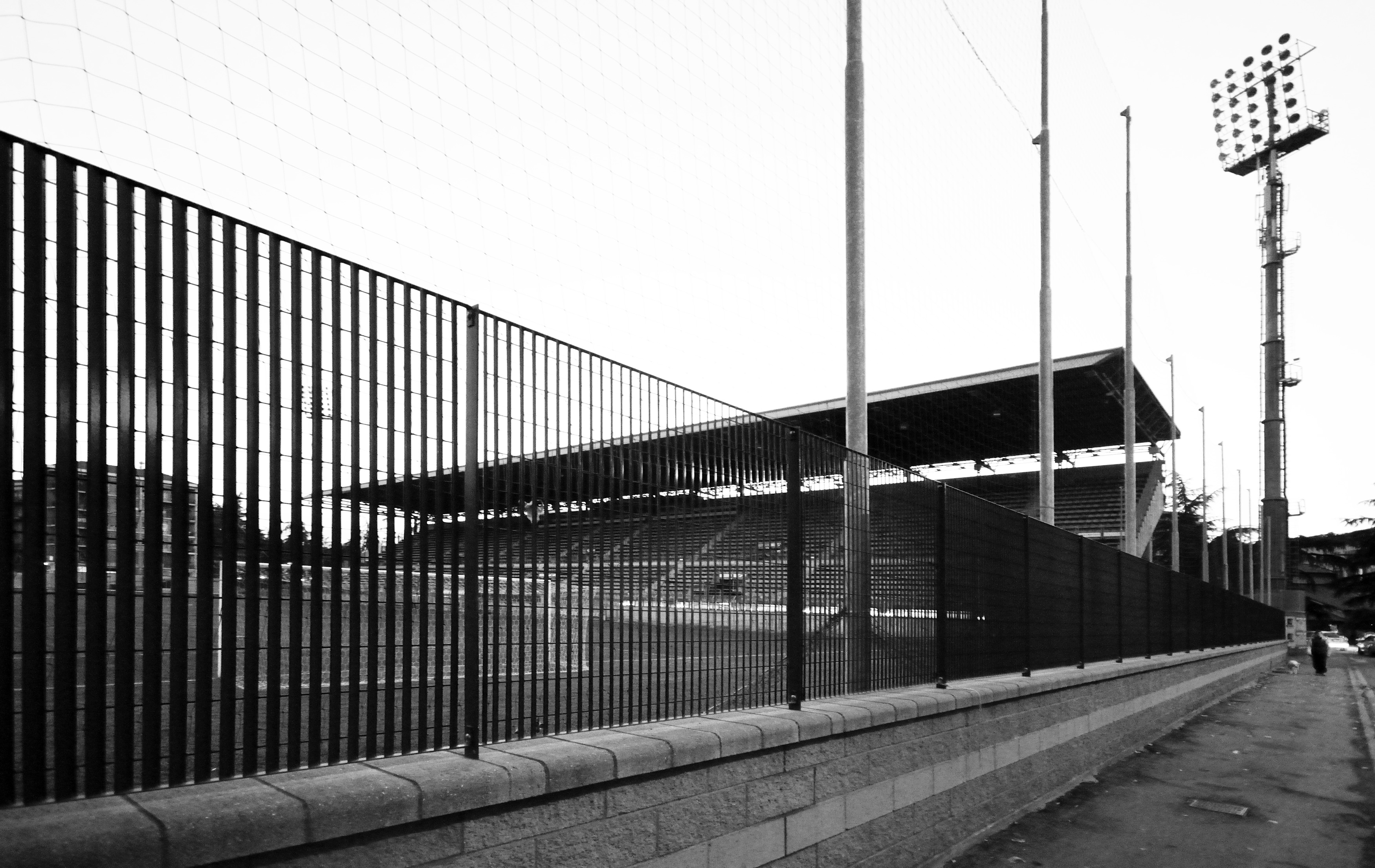
Stadio Mirabello

In 2001 all but the main stands were dismantled, lowering the capacity from 15.000 to 4.500. The stadium is still used for women's and youth football as well as rugby.
