= Sarkan, Kermanshah =

Sarkan سركن
- Village
- Location within Iran
- Coordinates: 34°29′33″N 46°50′03″E
- Country: Iran
- Province: Kermanshah
- County: Kermanshah
- Bakhsh: Central
- Rural District: Baladarband

Population (2006)
  - Total: 74
- Time zone: UTC+3:30 (IRST)
  - Summer (DST): UTC+4:30 (IRDT)

Sarkan (Persian: سركن; also known as Sarkan-e Ḩasanābād) is a village in Baladarband Rural District, in the Central District of Kermanshah County, Kermanshah Province, Iran. At the 2006 census, its population was 74, in 13 families.
