= Lumar =

City in Ilam province, Iran

Lumar Persian: لومار
- City
- Location within Iran Location within Ilam Province
- Coordinates: 33°34′03″N 46°48′51″E
- Country: Iran
- Province: Ilam
- County: Sirvan
- District: Central

Population (2016)
  - Total: 2,696
- Time zone: UTC+3:30 (IRST)

Lumar (Persian: لومار) (Note: Also romanized as Lūmār; also known as Shahrak Lūmār) is a city in the Central District of Sirvan County, Ilam province, Iran, serving as capital of both the county and the district. It is also the administrative center for Lumar Rural District.

== Demographics ==
=== Ethnicity ===
The city is populated by Kurds.

=== Population ===
At the time of the 2006 National Census, the city's population was 2,702 in 591 households, when it was capital of the former Shirvan District of Chardavol County. (Note: Formerly Shirvan and Chardavol County) The following census in 2011 counted 2,658 people in 670 households. The 2016 census measured the population of the city as 2,696 people in 764 households, by which time the district had been separated from the county in the establishment of Sirvan County. The city and the rural district were transferred to the new Central District, with Lumar as the county's capital.
