= Sarkan-e Olya =

Sarkan-e Olya سركان عليا
- Village
- Location within Iran
- Coordinates: 31°47′08″N 49°47′38″E
- Country: Iran
- Province: Khuzestan
- County: Izeh
- Bakhsh: Central
- Rural District: Holayjan

Population (2006)
  - Total: 598
- Time zone: UTC+3:30 (IRST)
  - Summer (DST): UTC+4:30 (IRDT)

Sarkan-e Olya (Persian: سركان عليا, also Romanized as Sarkān-e ‘Olyā; also known as Sarākān ‘Olyā, Sarkān-e Bālā, Sarkūn-e Bāla, Sarkūn-e ‘Olyā, and Sarkūn ‘Olyā) is a village in Holayjan Rural District, in the Central District of Izeh County, Khuzestan Province, Iran. At the 2006 census, its population was 598, in 117 families.
