= Fabrizio Larini =

Italian footballer and executive

Fabrizio Larini (born 31 March 1953, in Parma) is an Italian former footballer who has served as Sporting Director of Novara Calcio since November 2013. He played as a midfielder.

After beginning his playing career in the youth system of Internazionale, Larini made numerous appearances in the second and third tiers of Italian football, including five seasons in Serie B (four with Palermo and one with SPAL), and spells in the third tier with Solbiatese, Trento, Cremonese, Parma and Reggiana. He played as a midfielder.

Larini was sporting director of Udinese from 2010 to 2013, and took up the equivalent post with Novara in November 2013.
