= Saman Rural District =

Rural district in Chaharmahal and Bakhtiari province, Iran

Saman Rural District Persian: دهستان سامان
- Rural District
- Location within Iran
- Coordinates: 32°29′N 50°55′E
- Country: Iran
- Province: Chaharmahal and Bakhtiari
- County: Saman
- District: Central
- Established: 1987
- Capital: Shurab-e Saghir

Population (2016)
  - Total: 5,473
- Time zone: UTC+3:30 (IRST)

Saman Rural District (Persian: دهستان سامان) is in the Central District of Saman County, Chaharmahal and Bakhtiari province, Iran. Its capital is the village of Shurab-e Saghir.

== Demographics ==
=== Population ===
At the time of the 2006 National Census, the rural district's population (as a part of the former Saman District in Shahrekord County) was 9,400 in 2,458 households. There were 10,085 inhabitants in 2,947 households at the following census of 2011. The 2016 census measured the population of the rural district as 5,473 in 1,729 households, by which time the district had been separated from the county in the establishment of Saman County. The rural district was transferred to the new Central District. The most populous of its eight villages was Shurab-e Saghir, with 3,294 people.

=== Other villages in the rural district ===
- Chelvan
- Kah Kesh
- Mohammadabad-e Tabatabayi
