= Hureh Rural District =

Rural district in Chaharmahal and Bakhtiari province, Iran

Hureh Rural District Persian: دهستان هوره
- Rural District
- Location within Iran
- Coordinates: 32°36′N 50°51′E
- Country: Iran
- Province: Chaharmahal and Bakhtiari
- County: Saman
- District: Zayandehrud
- Established: 1987
- Capital: Hureh

Population (2016)
  - Total: 6,398
- Time zone: UTC+3:30 (IRST)

Hureh Rural District (Persian: دهستان هوره) is in Zayandehrud District of Saman County, Chaharmahal and Bakhtiari province, Iran. It is administered from the city of Hureh.

== Demographics ==
=== Population ===
At the time of the 2006 National Census, the rural district's population (as a part of the former Saman District in Shahrekord County) was 10,280 in 2,854 households. There were 10,483 inhabitants in 3,267 households at the following census of 2011. The 2016 census measured the population of the rural district as 6,398 in 2,062 households, by which time the district had been separated from the county in the establishment of Saman County. The rural district was transferred to the new Zayandehrud District. The most populous of its six villages was Hureh (now a city), with 2,548 people.

=== Other villages in the rural district ===
- Cham Kaka
- Dashti
- Sadeqabad
- Savad Jan
- Yaseh Cha
