= Karezan District =

District in Ilam province, Iran

Karezan District Persian: بخش کارزان
- District
- Location within Iran Location within Ilam Province
- Coordinates: 33°39′25″N 46°35′30″E
- Country: Iran
- Province: Ilam
- County: Sirvan
- Capital: Cheshmeh Pahn

Population (2016)
  - Total: 7,252
- Time zone: UTC+3:30 (IRST)

Karezan District (Persian: بخش کارزان) (Note: Also romanized as Karzan (Kurdish: کارزان)) is in Sirvan County, Ilam province, Iran. Its capital is the village of Cheshmeh Pahn.

== History ==
In 2013, Shirvan District was separated from Chardavol County (Note: Formerly Shirvan and Chardavol County) in the establishment of Sirvan County, which was divided into two districts of two rural districts each, with Lumar as its capital and only city.

== Demographics ==
=== Ethnicity ===
It is populated by Kurds from the Khezel tribe.

=== Population ===
At the time of the 2016 National Census, the district's population was 7,252 inhabitants in 1,958 households.

=== Administrative divisions ===
Karezan District Population
Administrative Divisions	2016
Karezan RD	3,892
Zangvan RD	3,360
Total	7,252
RD = Rural District
