= Karezan Rural District =

Rural district in Ilam province, Iran

Karezan Rural District Persian: دهستان كارزان
- Rural District
- Location within Iran Location within Ilam Province
- Coordinates: 33°43′04″N 46°30′39″E
- Country: Iran
- Province: Ilam
- County: Sirvan
- District: Karezan
- Capital: Karezan

Population (2016)
  - Total: 3,892
- Time zone: UTC+3:30 (IRST)

Karezan Rural District (Persian: دهستان كارزان) is in Karezan District of Sirvan County, Ilam province, Iran. Its capital is the village of Karezan. The previous capital of the rural district was the village of Cheshmeh Pahn, now a neighborhood in Karezan.

== Demographics ==
=== Population ===
At the time of the 2006 National Census, the rural district's population (as a part of the former Shirvan District of Chardavol County (Note: Formerly Shirvan and Chardavol County)) was 4,593 in 929 households. There were 4,345 inhabitants in 1,077 households at the following census of 2011. The 2016 census measured the population of the rural district as 3,892 in 1,084 households, by which time the district had been separated from the county in the establishment of Sirvan County. The rural district was transferred to the new Karezan District. The most populous of its 21 villages was Cheshmeh Khazaneh, with 645 people.
