= Zayandehrud District =

District in Chaharmahal and Bakhtiari province, Iran

Zayandehrud District Persian: بخش زاینده‌رود
- District
- Location within Iran
- Coordinates: 32°37′N 50°51′E
- Country: Iran
- Province: Chaharmahal and Bakhtiari
- County: Saman
- Established: 2013
- Capital: Hureh

Population (2016)
  - Total: 10,167
- Time zone: UTC+3:30 (IRST)

Zayandehrud District (Persian: بخش زاینده‌رود) is in Saman County, Chaharmahal and Bakhtiari province, Iran. Its capital is the city of Hureh.

== History ==
In 2013, Saman District was separated from Shahrekord County in the establishment of Saman County, which was divided into two districts of two rural districts each, with Saman as its capital and only city at the time. The village of Hureh was converted to a city in 2017.

== Demographics ==
=== Population ===
At the time of the 2016 National Census, the district's population was 10,167 inhabitants living in 3,288 households.

=== Administrative divisions ===
Zayandehrud District Population
Administrative Divisions	2016
Hureh RD	6,398
Zarrin RD	3,769
Hureh (city) (Note: Became a city after the 2016 census)	
Total	10,167
RD = Rural District
