= Central District (Saman County) =

District in Chaharmahal and Bakhtiari province, Iran

Central District (Saman County) Persian: بخش مرکزی شهرستان سامان
- District
- Location within Iran
- Coordinates: 32°29′N 50°55′E
- Country: Iran
- Province: Chaharmahal and Bakhtiari
- County: Saman
- Established: 2013
- Capital: Saman

Population (2016)
  - Total: 24,449
- Time zone: UTC+3:30 (IRST)

The Central District of Saman County (Persian: بخش مرکزی شهرستان سامان) is in Chaharmahal and Bakhtiari province, Iran Its capital is the city of Saman.

== History ==
In 2013, Saman District was separated from Shahrekord County in the establishment of Saman County, which was divided into two districts of two rural districts each, with Saman as its capital and only city at the time.

== Demographics ==
=== Population ===
At the time of the 2016 National Census, the district's population was 24,449 inhabitants living in 7,792 households.

=== Administrative divisions ===
Central District (Saman County) Population
Administrative Divisions	2016
Chama RD	4,784
Saman RD	5,473
Saman (city)	14,192
Total	24,449
RD = Rural District
