= Rudbar Rural District (Sirvan County) =

Rural district in Ilam province, Iran

Rudbar Rural District Persian: دهستان رودبار
- Rural District
- Location within Iran Location within Ilam Province
- Coordinates: 33°28′10″N 46°53′18″E
- Country: Iran
- Province: Ilam
- County: Sirvan
- District: Central
- Capital: Zoheyri-ye Olya

Population (2016)
  - Total: 2,872
- Time zone: UTC+3:30 (IRST)

Rudbar Rural District (Persian: دهستان رودبار) is in the Central District of Sirvan County, Ilam province, Iran. Its capital is the village of Zoheyri-ye Olya.

== History ==
In 2013, Shirvan District was separated from Chardavol County (Note: Formerly Shirvan and Chardavol County) in the establishment of Sirvan County, and Rudbar Rural District was created in the new Central District.

== Demographics ==
=== Population ===
At the time of the 2016 National Census, the rural district's population was 2,872 in 817 households, by which time the district had been separated from the county in the establishment of Sirvan County. The most populous of its 21 villages was Cham Ruteh, with 481 people.
