= Shirvan District =

Former district in Ilam province, Iran

Shirvan District Persian: بخش شیروان
- Former District
- Location within Iran Location within Ilam Province
- Coordinates: 33°36′N 46°40′E
- Country: Iran
- Province: Ilam
- County: Chardavol
- Capital: Lumar

Population (2011)
  - Total: 15,855
- Time zone: UTC+3:30 (IRST)

Shirvan District (Persian: بخش شیروان) is a former administrative division of Chardavol County, (Note: Formerly Shirvan and Chardavol County) Ilam province, Iran. Its capital was the city of Lumar.

== History ==
After the 2011 National Census, the district was separated from the county in the establishment of Sirvan County.

== Demographics ==
=== Population ===
At the time of the 2006 census, the district's population was 17,197 in 3,560 households. The following census in 2011 counted 15,855 people in 3,943 households.

=== Administrative divisions ===
Shirvan District Population
Administrative Divisions	2006	2011
Karezan RD	4,593	4,345
Lumar RD	6,223	5,157
Zangvan RD	3,679	3,695
Lumar (city)	2,702	2,658
Total	17,197	15,855
RD = Rural District
