= Lumar Rural District =

Rural district in Ilam province, Iran

Lumar Rural District Persian: دهستان لومار
- Rural District
- Location within Iran Location within Ilam Province
- Coordinates: 33°33′46″N 46°45′49″E
- Country: Iran
- Province: Ilam
- County: Sirvan
- District: Central
- Capital: Lumar

Population (2016)
  - Total: 1,584
- Time zone: UTC+3:30 (IRST)

Lumar Rural District (Persian: دهستان لومار) is in the Central District of Sirvan County, Ilam province, Iran. It is administered from the city of Lumar.

== Demographics ==
=== Population ===
At the time of the 2006 National Census, the rural district's population (as a part of the former Shirvan District of Chardavol County (Note: Formerly Shirvan and Chardavol County)) was 6,223 in 1,276 households. There were 5,157 inhabitants in 1,292 households at the following census of 2011. The 2016 census measured the population of the rural district as 1,584 in 450 households, by which time the district had been separated from the county in the establishment of Sirvan County. The rural district was transferred to the new Central District. The most populous of its 16 villages was Eslamiyeh, with 347 people.
