= Saman County =

County in Chaharmahal and Bakhtiari province, Iran

Saman County Persian: شهرستان سامان
- County
- Location of Saman County in Chaharmahal and Bakhtiari province (top, purple)

- Location of Chaharmahal and Bakhtiari province in Iran
- Coordinates: 32°33′N 50°55′E
- Country: Iran
- Province: Chaharmahal and Bakhtiari
- Established: 2013
- Capital: Saman
- Districts: Central, Zayandeh Rud

Population (2016)
  - Total: 34,616
- Time zone: UTC+3:30 (IRST)

Saman County (Persian: شهرستان سامان) is in Chaharmahal and Bakhtiari province, Iran. Its capital is the city of Saman.

== History ==
In 2013, Saman District was separated from Shahrekord County in the establishment of Saman County, which was divided into two districts of two rural districts each, with Saman as its capital and only city at the time. The village of Hureh was converted to a city in 2017.

== Demographics ==
=== Population ===
At the time of the 2016 National Census, the county's population was 34,616 in 11,080 households.

=== Administrative divisions ===
Saman County's population and administrative structure are shown in the following table.

Saman County Population
| Administrative Divisions | 2016 |
|---|---|
| Central District | 24,449 |
| Chama RD | 4,784 |
| Saman RD | 5,473 |
| Saman (city) | 14,192 |
| Zayandehrud District | 10,167 |
| Hureh RD | 6,398 |
| Zarrin RD | 3,769 |
| Hureh (city) (Note: Became a city after the 2016 census) | |
| Total | 34,616 |
RD = Rural District

== See also ==
Media related to Saman County at Wikimedia Commons
