= Central District (Sirvan County) =

District in Ilam province, Iran

Central District (Sirvan County) Persian: بخش مرکزی شهرستان سیروان
- District
- Location within Iran Location within Ilam Province
- Coordinates: 33°30′10″N 46°50′49″E
- Country: Iran
- Province: Ilam
- County: Sirvan
- Capital: Lumar

Population (2016)
  - Total: 7,152
- Time zone: UTC+3:30 (IRST)

The Central District of Sirvan County (Persian: بخش مرکزی شهرستان سیروان) is in Ilam province, Iran. Its capital is the city of Lumar.

== History ==
In 2013, Shirvan District was separated from Chardavol County (Note: Formerly Shirvan and Chardavol County) in the establishment of Sirvan County, which was divided into two districts of two rural districts each, with Lumar as its capital and only city.

== Demographics ==
=== Population ===
At the time of the 2016 National Census, the district's population was 7,152 inhabitants in 2,031 households.

=== Administrative divisions ===
Central District (Sirvan County) Population
Administrative Divisions	2016
Lumar RD	1,584
Rudbar RD	2,872
Lumar (city)	2,696
Total	7,152
RD = Rural District
