= Saman District, Iran =

Former district in Chaharmahal and Bakhtiari province, Iran

Saman District Persian: بخش سامان
- Former District
- Location within Iran
- Coordinates: 32°33′N 50°55′E
- Country: Iran
- Province: Chaharmahal and Bakhtiari
- County: Shahrekord
- Established: 1997
- Capital: Saman

Population (2011)
  - Total: 35,895
- Time zone: UTC+3:30 (IRST)

Saman District (Persian: بخش سامان) is a former administrative division of Shahrekord County, Chaharmahal and Bakhtiari province, Iran. Its capital was the city of Saman.

== History ==
In 2013, the district was separated from the county in the establishment of Saman County

== Demographics ==
=== Population ===
At the time of the 2006 National Census, the district's population was 34,457 in 9,273 households. The following census in 2011 counted 35,895 people in 10,772 households.

=== Administrative divisions ===
Saman District Population
Administrative Divisions	2006	2011
Hureh RD	10,280	10,483
Saman RD	9,400	10,085
Saman (city)	14,777	15,327
Total	34,457	35,895
RD = Rural District
