= Sirvan County =

County in Ilam Province, Iran

Sirvan County Persian: شهرستان سیروان
- County
- Location of Sirvan County in Ilam province (top right, yellow)

- Location of Ilam province in Iran
- Coordinates: 33°36′N 46°40′E
- Country: Iran
- Province: Ilam
- Capital: Lumar
- Districts: Central, Karezan

Population (2016)
  - Total: 14,404
- Time zone: UTC+3:30 (IRST)

Sirvan County (Persian: شهرستان سیروان) (Note: Kurdish: Şirvan) is in Ilam Province, Iran. Its capital is the city of Lumar.

== History ==
In 2013, Shirvan District was separated from Chardavol County (Note: Formerly Shirvan and Chardavol County) in the establishment of Sirvan County, which was divided into two districts of two rural districts each, with Lumar as its capital and only city.

== Demographics ==
=== Ethnicity ===
The county is populated by Kurds.

=== Population ===
At the time of the 2016 National Census, the county had 14,404 inhabitants in 3,989 households.

=== Administrative divisions ===
Sirvan County's population and administrative structure are shown in the following table.

Sirvan County Population
Administrative Divisions	2016
Central District	7,152
Lumar RD	1,584
Rudbar RD	2,872
Lumar (city)	2,696
Karezan District	7,252
Karezan RD	3,892
Zangvan RD	3,360
Total	14,404
RD = Rural District

== See also ==
Media related to Sirvan County at Wikimedia Commons
