= Calendar (disambiguation) =

A calendar is a catalogue, list or table, most commonly used for a table of days, months, years etc.

Calendar may also refer to:

== Actual calendars ==
- Annual calendar, indicating the date or the day, by number or by name (full or abridged), either by watch hands or rotating disk
- Perennial calendar
- Perpetual calendar
- Calendar (archives), a descriptive inventory or summary of archival documents
- Calendar of saints, a traditional Christian method of organizing a liturgical year by associating each day with one or more saints
- Calendar (publication), a physical object consisting of a table of days, months, years etc.

== Applications and services ==
- Calendaring software, software with a calendar and scheduling possibilities
- Calendar (Apple), a Mac OS X calendar application made by Apple Inc.
- Calendar (Windows), a calendar application integrated into certain versions of Microsoft Windows
- Google Calendar, a web-based calendar service and mobile application
- Outlook Calendar on Outlook.com, formerly named Calendar, a consumer web-based calendar service

== Arts and entertainment ==
=== Film and television ===
- Calendar (British TV programme), a news and current affairs programme broadcast on ITV Yorkshire in the United Kingdom
- Calendar (American TV program), a weekday morning news and information program shown in the United States on CBS from 1961 to 1963
- The Calendar (1931 film), a British drama film starring Herbert Marshall
- Calendar (1993 film), a 1993 film directed by Atom Egoyan
- The Calendar (1948 film), a British remake
- Calendar (2009 film), a 2009 Malayalam film directed by Mahesh
- Calendar (2017 film) a 2017 Assamese film directed by Homjyoti Talukdar

=== Other ===
- Calendar Man, a DC Comics supervillain character
- The Calendar (novel), a 1930 novel by Edgar Wallace
- "The Calendar" (song), a song by Panic! at the Disco on their 2011 album Vices & Virtues

== See also ==
- Calender, a device for smoothing paper
- Callander, a burgh in the region of Stirling, Scotland
- Callendar (disambiguation)
- Callender (disambiguation)
- Colander, a type of sieve
- Qalandar (disambiguation)
