= John Callender =

John Callender may refer to:

- John Callender (psychiatrist) (born 1954), Scottish psychiatrist and philosopher
- John Callender (footballer) (1903–1980), English footballer
- Sir John Callender, 1st Baronet, Member of Parliament for Berwick-upon-Tweed, 1795–1802
- John Callender (clergyman), (1706–1748), American Clergyman and Author

== See also ==
- Callender (surname)
