= Callander (disambiguation) =

Callander is a town in Scotland.

Callander may also refer to:

== Places ==
- Callander, Ontario, Canada
- Callander Bay, Ontario

== Other uses ==
- Callander (surname)
- Callander F.C., 19th-century Scottish football club

== See also ==
- Calendar
- Calender
- Callendar (disambiguation)
- Callender (disambiguation)
- Colander
- Qalandar (disambiguation)
