= Callender (surname) =

Callender is a surname of Scottish origin. Notable people with the surname include:

== A ==
- Alvin Andrew Callender (1893–1918), American pursuit pilot and flying ace in World War I
- Arthur Callender (1875–1936), English assistant to Howard Carter during the excavation of Tutankhamun's tomb

== C ==
- Charles Callender, owner of blackface minstrel shows in 19th century America
- Claire Callender (1954–2025), British academic
- Clarence Callender (born 1961), athlete
- Colin Callender (born 1952), English television producer

== D ==
- Drake Callender (born 1997), American soccer player

== E ==
- Emmanuel Callender (born 1984), athlete
- Eugene Callender (1926–2013), American pastor and activist

== J ==
- James T. Callender, late 18th and early 19th century journalist
- Jamie Callender, American politician
- John Callender, Scottish psychiatrist and philosopher
- John Callender (1903–1980), English footballer

== M ==
- Marie Callender, American baker and restaurateur
- Mary Pauline Callender, author of puberty and menstruation advice booklets in the 1920s and 1930s used to promote Kotex products

== R ==
- Reg Callender (1892–1915), English footballer
- Robert Callender (born 1950), Canadian cricketer
- Robert Callender (frontiersman) (1726–1776), Pennsylvania fur trader

== S ==
- Stanford Callender, Trinidad and Tobago politician
