= Qalandar =

Qalandar may refer to:

- Qalandar (tribe), a Hazara tribe found in Afghanistan
- Qalandariyya, a Sufi mystic order
- Qalandar (title), a title for Sufi saints
- Qalandar (clan), a Muslim community found in North India and Pakistan

== Places in Iran ==
- Qalandar, Ahar, a village in East Azerbaijan Province, Iran
- Qalandar Kashteh, a village in Fars Province, Iran
- Qalandar-e Olya, a village in Ilam Province, Iran
- Qalandar-e Sofla, a village in Ilam Province, Iran
- Qalandar-e Laki, a village in Kermanshah Province, Iran
- Qalandar, Kurdistan, a village in Kurdistan Province, Iran
- Qalandar, Delfan, a village in Lorestan Province, Iran
- Qalandar, Kuhdasht, a village in Lorestan Province, Iran

== Saints ==
- Bu Ali Shah Qalandar, an Indian Sufi mystic and saint
- Lal Shahbaz Qalandar, a Sufi saint born in Iran and buried in Sindh
- Shams Ali Qalandar, a Sufi saint from Punjab, Pakistan, 1874-1966

== Cricket ==
- Durban Qalandars, a professional cricket team
- Lahore Qalandars, a professional cricket team

== Other uses ==
- Qalandar (TV series), a 2022–2023 Pakistani series
