= Callander (surname) =

Callander is a surname of Scottish origin. Notable people with the surname include:

- Charlie Callander, property steward of Richmond Football Club in Australian Rules Football
- Don Callander, American novelist
- Donald Callander, British Army officer
- Drew Callander, Canadian hockey player (played for Philadelphia and Vancouver)
- Gary Callander, Scottish Rugby Union player
- Jock Callander, Canadian hockey player and coach (played for Pittsburgh and Tampa Bay)
- Peter Callander, British songwriter

== Fictional characters ==
- Davey Callander, minor character of the video game Red Dead Redemption 2
- Mac Callander, a minor character of the video game Red Dead Redemption 2
