= United Baptist Church (Newport, Rhode Island) =

Coordinates: 41.490296°N 71.312000°W

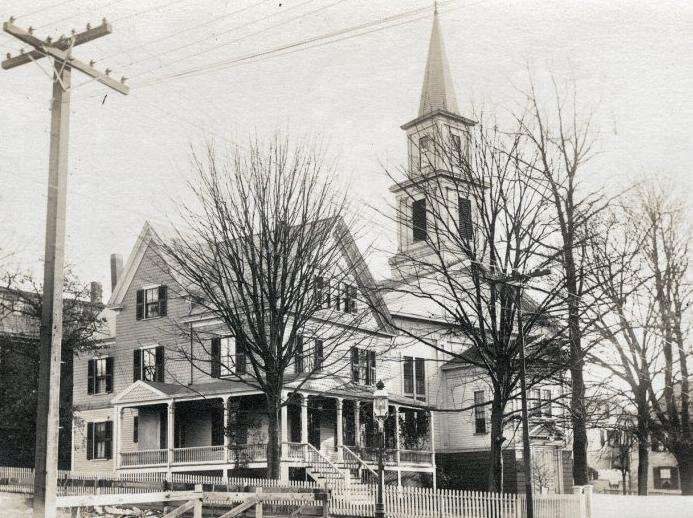
First Baptist Church, c. 1915

The United Baptist Church, John Clarke Memorial (previously known as the First Baptist Church in Newport, Second Baptist Church in Newport and the Second Baptist Church in America) is a historic Baptist church in Newport, Rhode Island, USA that was founded in 1638–1644. It is one of the two oldest Baptist congregations in the United States and is currently affiliated with the American Baptist Churches USA. The current meeting house of the church was constructed in 1846.

== History ==
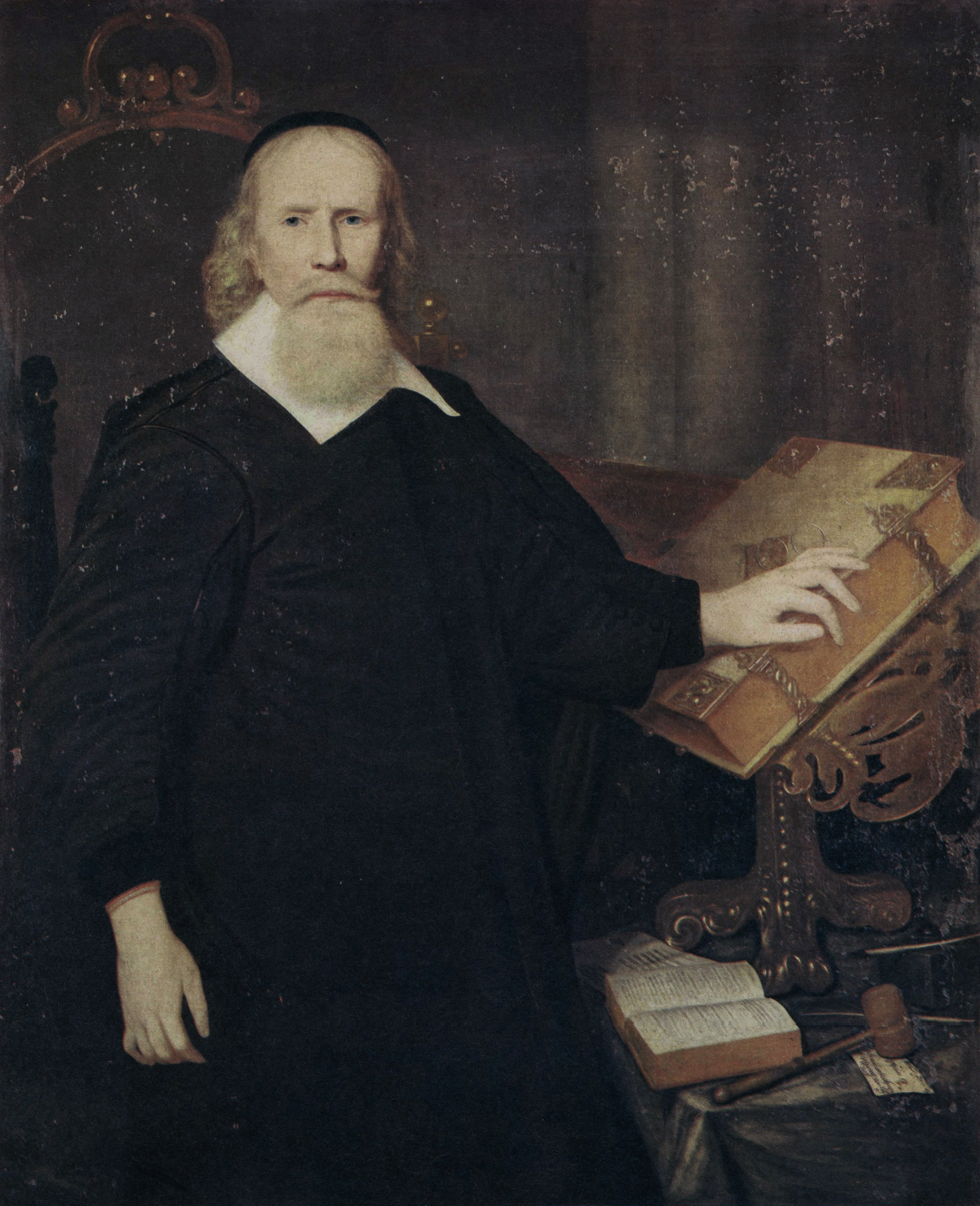
Presumed portrait of John Clarke, c.1659, currently in the Redwood Library in Newport, Rhode Island

=== 17th century ===
Around 1638 Roger Williams founded the First Baptist Church in America in nearby Providence, after being exiled from Massachusetts in 1636. In 1638 John Clarke, a General Baptist minister and physician from England, started leading services in nearby Portsmouth, Rhode Island (Newport County) after he, Williams and other Puritans were exiled from Massachusetts after disagreements with the Congregationalist leadership.

By 1644 Clarke's group moved to Newport where the current church was founded and the first building was constructed at Green's End within that same year, which was the first church building of any denomination in the colony. The congregation used the building until 1708 when the first church building in Newport was constructed on Tanner Street in Newport on the corner of Calendar Avenue, adjacent to the cemetery, which was established on land donated by Clarke. In addition to Clarke, Obadiah Holmes and John Crandall were active in the leadership of the church in the seventeenth century.

In 1656, while Clarke was in England — advocating for the Colony's royal charter and religious liberty — a group of congregants seceded from the church to found the Second Baptist Church in Newport, becoming the Six Principle Baptists (Second Baptist would eventually reunite with First Baptist in 1946, hence its present name).

In December 1671, two members of the church — Samuel and Tacy Hubbard — withdrew and joined with Stephen Mumford, a Seventh Day Baptist (SDB) from England, and others. Their new congregation was the first SDB church in America.

=== 18th century ===
From 1731 to 1748 John Callendar, a prominent clergyman and author, served as pastor of the church. In 1737 Hezekiah Carpenter and Josiah Lyons donated the current land on Spring Street for the chapel which was constructed that year.

=== 19th century ===
The current chapel was constructed as a replacement in 1846, and the earlier building was eventually moved, then demolished.

=== 20th century ===
According to the United Baptist Church's website "[i]n 1943, the Rev. Lester Revoir, who became the pastor of the nearby Second Baptist Church on Clarke Street, in 1942, added to his responsibilities by becoming the pastor of the First Baptist Church. Three years later, in 1946, the First and Second Baptist Churches merged to form “The United Baptist Church, John Clarke Memorial", the present name of the church." The church steeple was replaced with a smaller version after the 1938 Hurricane.

== See also ==
- Baptists in the United States
