= John Callender (clergyman) =

American pastor and historian

- Born: John Callender Jr. 1706; Boston, Massachusetts
- Died: 1748 (aged 41–42)
- Education: Harvard College A.B. 1726
- Known for: Clergyman, historian
- Notable work: pastor of the First Baptist Church in Newport, Rhode Island

John Callender Jr. (1706–1748) was an American historian and pastor of First Baptist Church in Newport, Rhode Island. He authored the first historical account of Rhode Island, An Historical Discourse on the Civil and Religious Affairs of the Colony of Rhode-Island, in New England in America. From the First Settlement in 1638, to the end of the First Century.

== Biography ==
=== Early life ===
Baptist clergyman and historian, John Callender was born in 1706 in Boston, Massachusetts, to John Callender, a shopkeeper, and Priscilla Man. In his early youth, John Callender showed unusual intellectual promise, he attended Harvard College at age 13, where he was introduced to the legacy of early Baptist's in America. The first president of Harvard College and theologian Henry Dunster had been influenced by early American Baptist leaders, Dr. John Clarke and other Rhode Island Baptists. Founder of Boston's first Baptist Church, Henry Dunster was forced to resign from Harvard after he refused to baptize his infant.

As a Harvard scholarship student, John Callender was supported by the benefactions of Thomas Hollis, a Baptist and Calvinist, and Thomas Brattle, then-Harvard College treasurer and a member of the Royal Society. At graduation in 1726, young Callender was awarded the honor of delivering an address on the proposition, "Scriptura credendi et agendi est norma perfecta et sola," or "The perfect and only rule for believing and acting is Scripture." John Callender was baptized that same year in 1726 by his uncle, Elisha Callender, the pastor of First Baptist Church in Boston, a congregation previously led by grandfather Ellis Callender. He was voted a license to preach in 1727, and thereafter, he briefly preached and taught school at First Baptist Church in Swansea in Bristol County.

=== Career as clergyman ===
Until 1730, Callender served as pastor at a historic Baptist Church in Swansea, Massachusetts. After leaving the pulpit in Swansea, Callender settled in United Baptist Church, in Newport, Rhode Island, where he remained for the rest of his life. Callender was ordained on October 13, 1731, by his uncle Elisha Callender, a pastor at First Baptist Church in Boston, who delivered a sermon on New Testament Book of Matthew, 28.18-19.

Callender's role in Newport from 1731 to 1748, 40-years before the ratification of the U.S. Constitution in 1788, has significance to the early history of the Baptist Church in North America. Roger Williams and John Clarke established The Baptist Church in Newport for religious freedom. In 1638, Minister John Clarke of Great Britain was exiled from Massachusetts after disagreeing with Puritan leaders, and sought freedom of worship in nearby Portsmouth, Rhode Island, (Newport County) By 1639, Williams had founded a Baptist church in Providence, Rhode Island, and in 1640, Clarke had established a Baptist church in Newport.

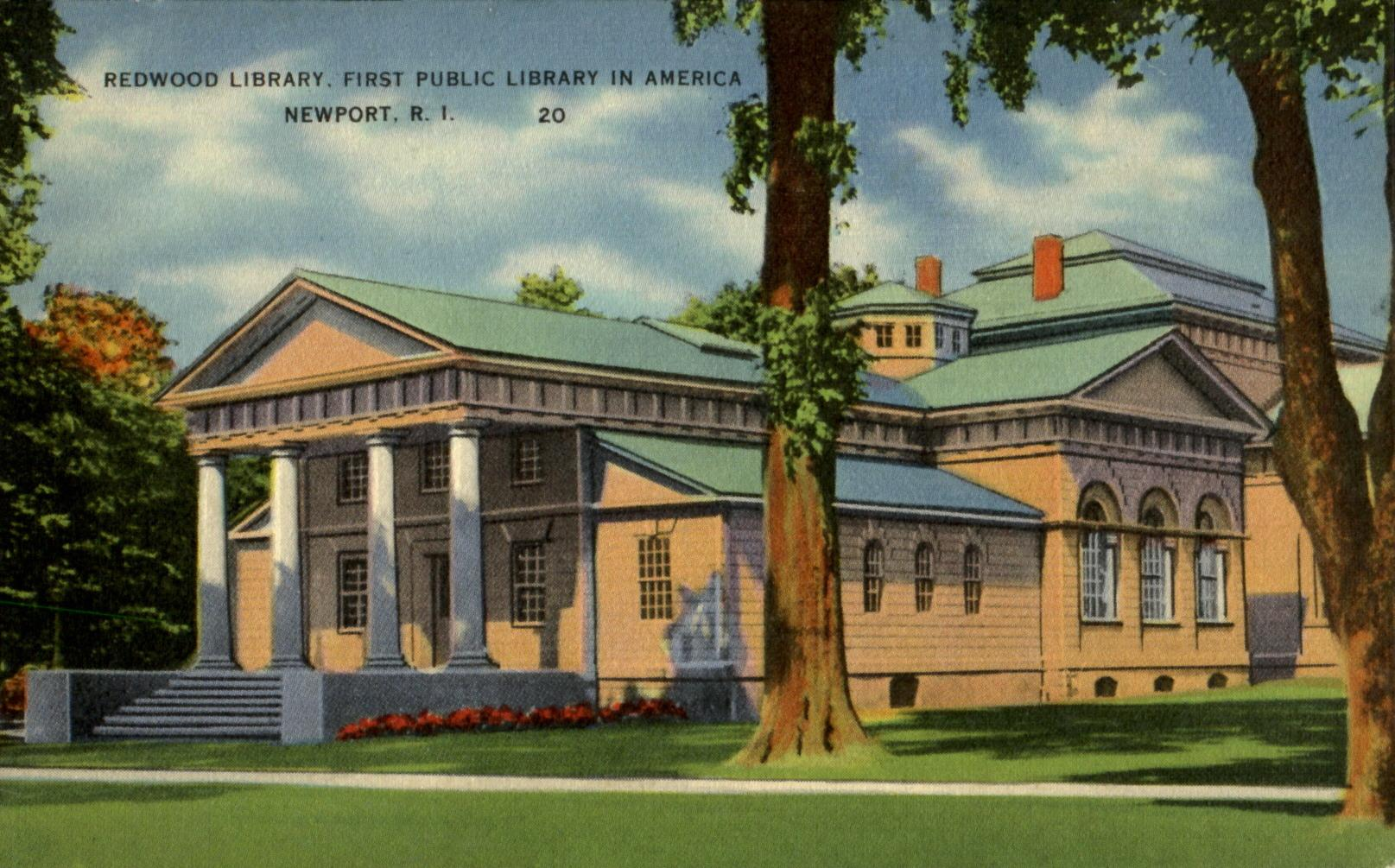
Redwood Library

=== Societal involvement ===
Shortly after moving to Newport, Rhode Island, in 1731, Callender became deeply interested in the public schools of Newport. He also became a member of an exclusive philosophical and literary society, later incorporated in 1874 as the company of the Redwood Library and Athenaeum, organized by Bishop Berkeley, which included Justice Edward Scott; Attorney General of Rhode Island Daniel Updike; Colonial governor of Rhode Island Josias Lyndon; John Brett; Thomas Ward; Chief Justice of the Rhode Island Supreme Court and signer of the Declaration of Independence William Ellery; Minister of Trinity Church, Newport, Rhode Island James Honyman; James Searing; John Checkley; Pastor of the First Baptist Church in Boston Jeremiah Condy; and occasional esteemed members, including Governor of the Colony of Rhode Island and Providence Plantations, Chief Justice of the Rhode Island Supreme Court, and signer of the Declaration of Independence Stephen Hopkins; as well as the poet, essayist, moralist, and biographer Samuel Johnson. The purpose of the society was to share ideas and collect valuable books, the combined efforts of which are still housed in the oldest section of the library, the Harrison Room. The Redwood Library and Anthenaeum is a Georgian-Palladian style building designed and built in 1750 by colonial American architect, Peter Harrison, from York, England, who emigrated to Rhode Island in 1740. Redwood Library and Athenaeum is credited as America's second oldest public library and first classical public building.

=== An Historical Discourse... and other publications ===
Callender is perhaps best known for his address An Historical Discourse on the Civil and Religious Affairs of the Colony of Rhode-Island, delivered on March 24, 1738; the first historical account of Rhode Island. Also known as "Century Sermon," it was for more than one hundred years, the only civic and religious history of Rhode Island, reprinted in 1838 by the Rhode Island Historical Society, with a memoir from the author, and notes by Romeo Elton.

Callender published sermons and a collection of documents related to the history of Baptists in America, with an afterword by Issac Backus. In 1739, he published a sermon delivered on the occasion of the ordination of Mr. Jeremiah Condy at First Baptist Church in Boston. A discourse published in 1791 recommends advantages of early religion to assist children to live lives of love in service to God. In 1745, Callender published a funeral sermon for Nathaniel Clap, and in 1763, "The Hymn to the Power of Harmony." He also published a historical oration delivered to the congregants in Boston, on July 4, 1797, to commemorate the anniversary of American independence.

=== Personal life and death ===
On February 15, 1730, Callender married Elizabeth Hardin of Swansea, Massachusetts. They had a family of six children: Elizabeth, Mary, John, Elias, Sarah, and Josias. Callender died on January 26, 1748, after a long and painful illness. John Callender Jr. is buried in the John Clarke Cemetery in Newport, Rhode Island.

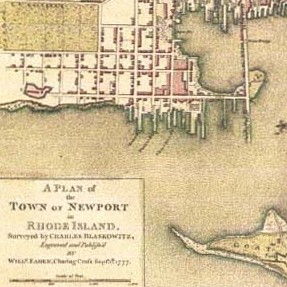
Easton Point map

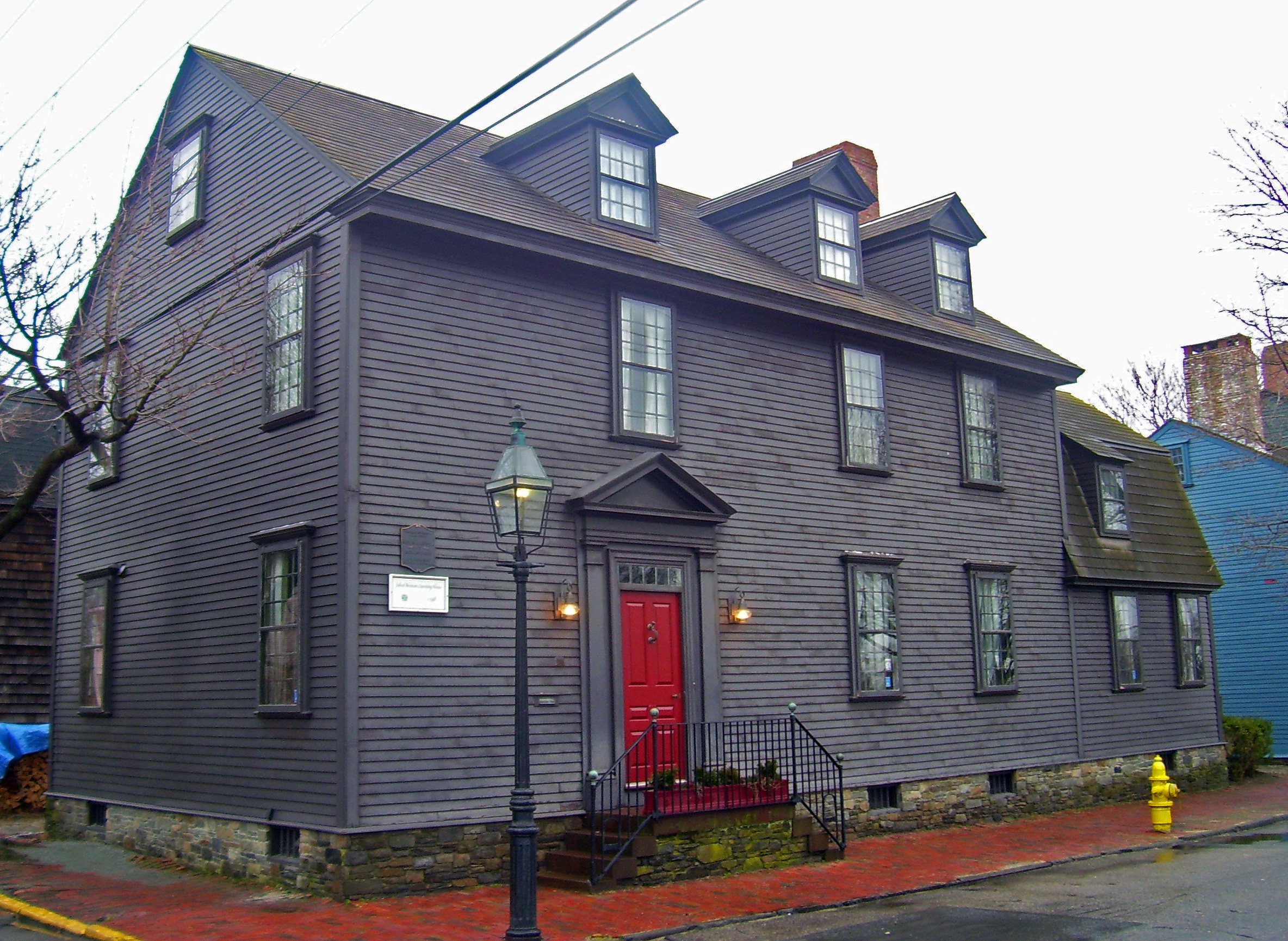
Washington Street house, Newport, RI

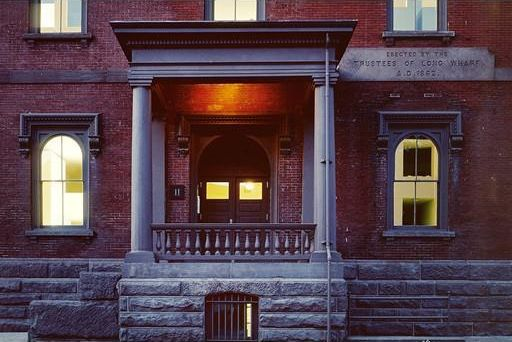
Callender School is listed on The National Register of Historic Places (NRHP); located in the "Easton's Point" section of Newport, Rhode Island.

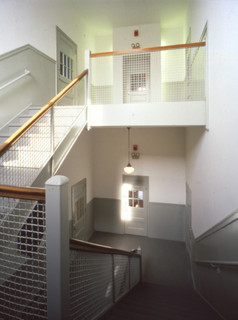
Callender School located on Willow Street in the Point, section of Newport was commissioned in 1862 by the Trustees of the Long Wharf. In 1906, the building was renamed "Callender School" to commemorate the bicentennial of the birth of John Callender. Callander School is listed on The National Register of Historic Places (NRHP).

== Modern legacy ==
John Callender (1706–1748) is the namesake of Callender School in Newport's historic Point section, or less commonly known, "Easton's Point" neighborhood of colonial houses, located between Washington and Farewell Streets. In 1862, a Renaissance Revival school building on Willow Street was commissioned, and dedicated on May 20, 1863, by The Trustees of the Long Wharf, a unique organization of merchants granted an act of incorporation in 1795 to rebuild the docks destroyed during the American Revolution. The school building was renamed Callender School, in 1906, to commemorate the bicentennial of the birth of John Callender. The Callender School building has since been listed on The National Register of Historic Places (NRHP).
