= Callender =

Callender may refer to:

- Callender (surname)
- Callender, Iowa, United States, a city
- An alternative spelling of Callander, Scotland, a town
- Marie Callender's, restaurant and food manufacturer

== See also ==
- Calendar
- Calender
- Callander (disambiguation)
- Callendar (disambiguation)
- Colander
- Qalandar (disambiguation)
