= Portrait of a Clergyman (de Ville) =

1639 painting by Guilliam de Ville

- 'The Unknown Clergyman'
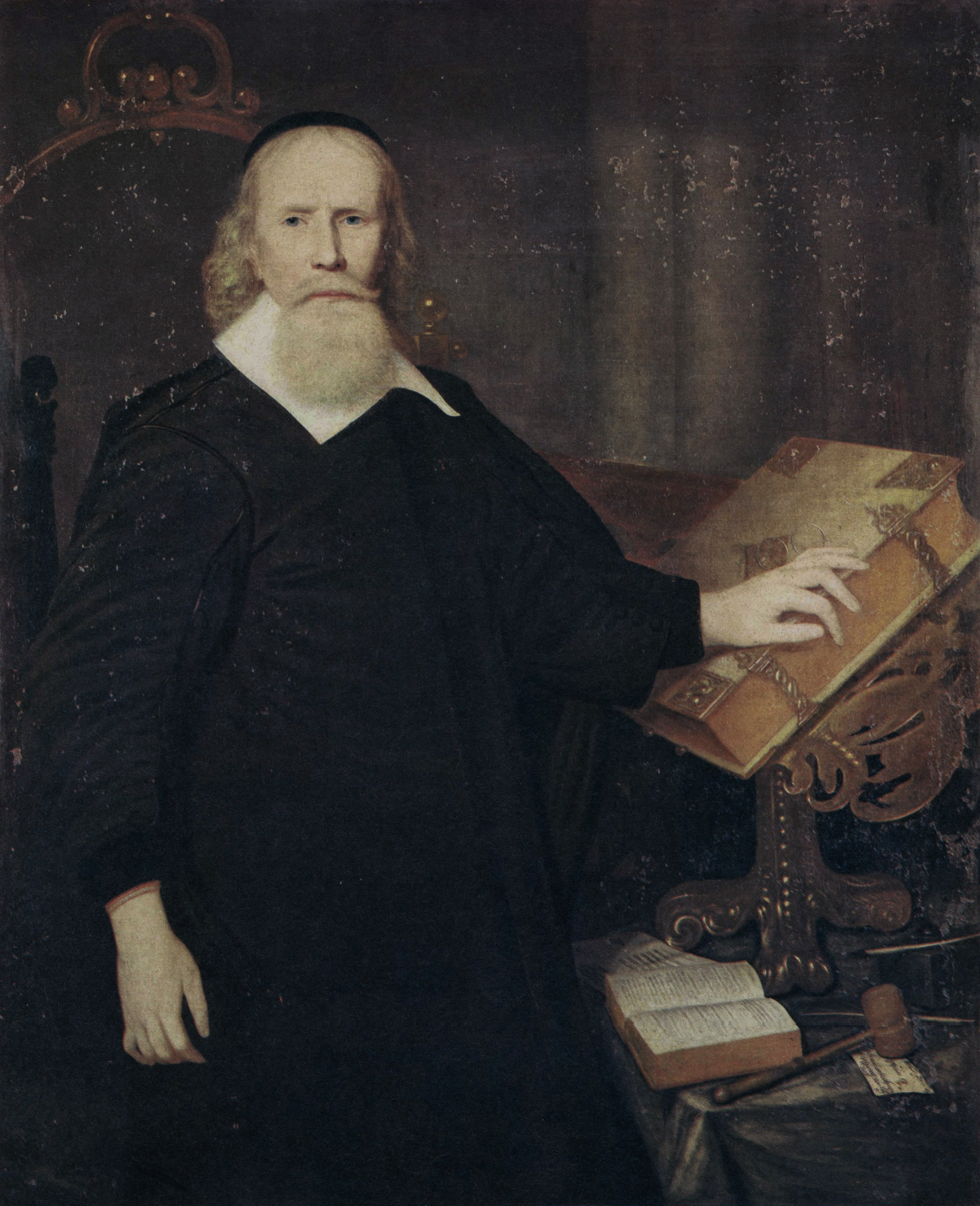
- Artist: Guilliam de Ville
- Year: 1639
- Type: Oil on canvas
- Subject: Unknown clergyman
- Dimensions: 129.5 cm × 107.1 cm (51.0 in × 42.2 in)
- Location: Redwood Library and Athenaeum, Newport, Rhode Island

Portrait of a Clergyman — sometimes called Portrait of a 17th Century Clergyman or The Unknown Clergyman — is an oil on canvas portrait painting by Guilliam de Ville (ca. 1614–1672) dated 1639. The identity of the subject, an elderly clergyman, is unknown. It is owned by the Redwood Library and Athenaeum (Identifier: PA.125), Newport, Rhode Island, USA, where it hangs.

De Ville was a Dutch painter of portraits and still lifes, born in Amsterdam and active in England. Only one other known painting by de Ville (a still life) survives.

== Description ==
The portrait is of an older male European seen in 3/4-length view. He is standing and turned slightly to his right. His left hand rests on a large book, probably the Bible. He has light hair and blue eyes and wears a white clerical collar and a black cassock. To left of the breast is the inscription “Aetatis [i.e., aged] 59”. There are clear dates in two places, both 1639. The artist's signature is on the paper by the head of a gavel.

== History and possible subject identities ==
The portrait may have been owned at one time by local Rhode Island historian Stephen Randall (1793–1874), who took special interest in his ancestor Roger Williams (ca. 1603–1683), the Puritan, Baptist, and founder of Providence Plantations. Randall may have gifted it to Redwood. In 1927, Providence artist Wilfred Duphinney suggested that the subject may in fact be Williams himself.

Wilber Cheesman Nelson was the author of a 95-page booklet on John Clarke (1609–1676), one of the founders of Portsmouth and Newport, Rhode Island. He popularized the notion in 1938 that it is a portrait of Clarke, a physician and Baptist minister, and this has been the popular choice ever since. Clarke biographer Louis Franklin Asher (d. 1996) even featured the portrait on the dust cover of his 1997 book.

There is no evidence, however, for either of these two identifications. The subject of the painting is indicated as being 59 years old in 1639 and would, therefore, have been born about 1580, thereby ruling out both Williams and Clarke. Asher proposes that the dates on the painting are a mistake for 1659, but he advances no rationale for how such a curious double error could have come about.
