= Qalandar-e Laki =

Qalandar-e Laki قلندرلكي
- Village
- Location within Iran
- Coordinates: 34°13′15″N 46°53′24″E
- Country: Iran
- Province: Kermanshah
- County: Kermanshah
- Bakhsh: Mahidasht
- Rural District: Mahidasht

Population (2006)
  - Total: 254
- Time zone: UTC+3:30 (IRST)
  - Summer (DST): UTC+4:30 (IRDT)

Qalandar-e Laki (Persian: قلندرلكي, also Romanized as Qalandar-e Lakī) is a village in Mahidasht Rural District, Mahidasht District, Kermanshah County, Kermanshah Province, Iran. At the 2006 census, its population was 254, in 50 families.
