= John Clarke (Baptist minister) =

English politician, physician, and minister

The Reverend John Clarke
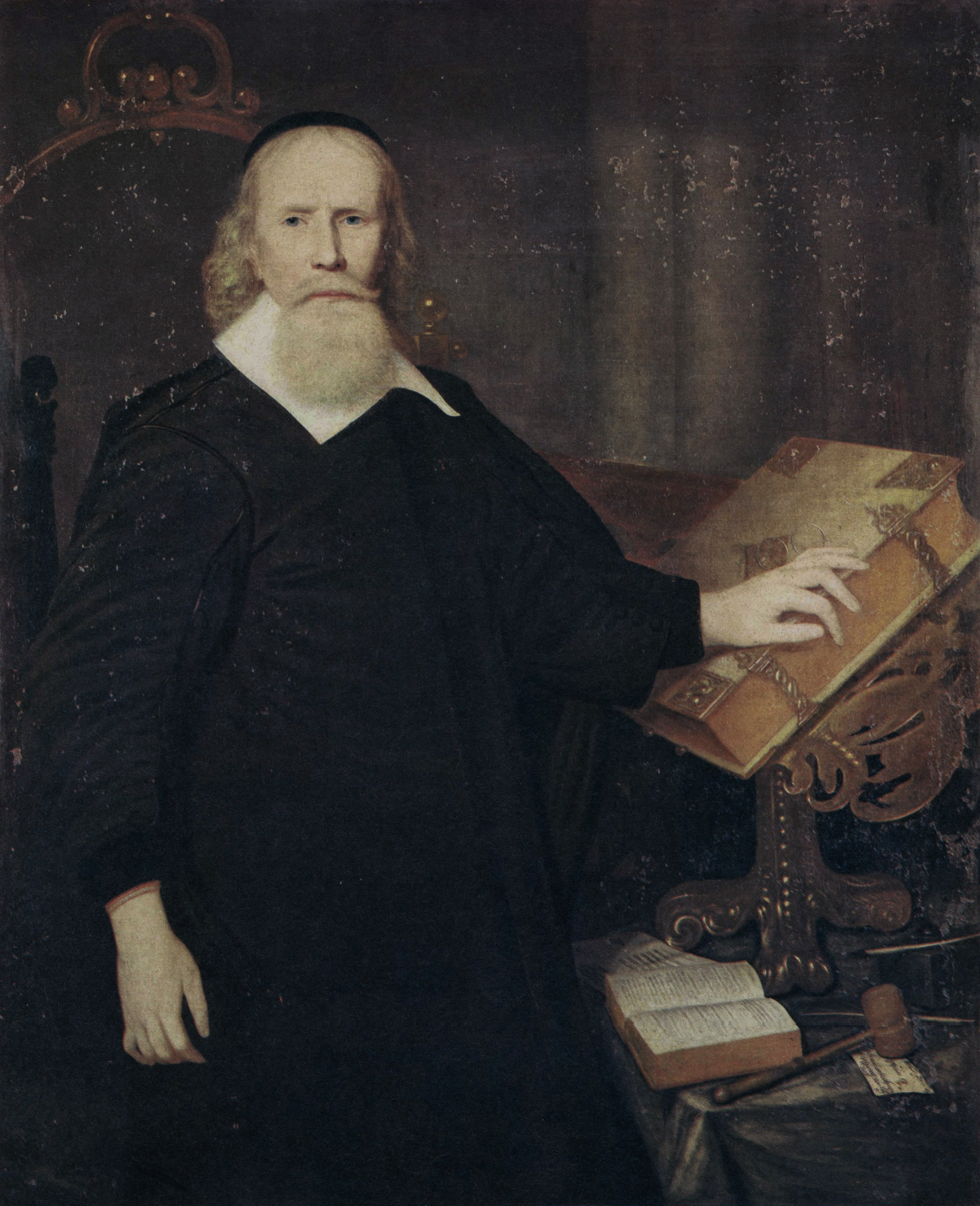
- The Unknown Clergyman (possible portrait of Clarke)

3rd and 5th Deputy Governor of the Colony of Rhode Island and Providence Plantations
- In office 1669–1670
- Governor: Benedict Arnold
- Preceded by: Nicholas Easton
- Succeeded by: Nicholas Easton
- In office 1671–1673
- Governor: Benedict Arnold
- Preceded by: Nicholas Easton
- Succeeded by: John Cranston

Personal details
- Born: Baptized 8 October 1609 Westhorpe, Suffolk, England
- Died: 20 April 1676 (aged 66) Newport, Rhode Island
- Resting place: Clarke Cemetery, Dr. Wheatland Blvd., Newport
- Spouse(s): (1) Elizabeth Harris (2) Jane (_____) Fletcher (3) Sarah (_____) Davis
- Education: Brasenose College (Bachelor of Arts, 1628; Master of Arts, 1632); Leiden University (Bachelor of Science, 1635)
- Occupation: Physician, Baptist minister, Colonial agent, Deputy, Deputy Governor

John Clarke (October 1609 – 20 April 1676) was a New England English-born politician, physician, and Puritan Baptist minister, co-founder of the Colony of Rhode Island and Providence Plantations, author of its influential charter, and a leading advocate of religious liberty in America.

Clarke was born in Westhorpe, Suffolk, England. He received an extensive education, including a master's degree in England followed by medical training in Leiden, Holland. He arrived at the Massachusetts Bay Colony in 1637 during the Antinomian Controversy and decided to go to Aquidneck Island with many exiles from the conflict. He became a co-founder of Portsmouth and Newport, Rhode Island, and established America's second Baptist church in Newport. Baptists were declared heretics in Massachusetts and were banned there, but Clarke wanted to make inroads there and spent time in the Boston jail after making a mission trip to the town of Lynn, Massachusetts. Following his poor treatment in prison, he went to England where he published a book on the persecutions of the Baptists in Massachusetts and on his theological beliefs. The fledgling Rhode Island colony needed an agent in England, so he remained there for more than a decade handling the colony's interests.

The other New England colonies were hostile to Rhode Island, and both Massachusetts Bay and Connecticut Colony had made incursions into Rhode Island territory. After the restoration of the monarchy in England in 1660, it was imperative that Rhode Island receive a royal charter to protect its territorial integrity. It was Clarke's role to obtain such a document, and he saw this as an opportunity to include religious freedoms never seen before in any constitutional charter. He wrote ten petitions and letters to King Charles II and negotiated for months with Connecticut over territorial boundaries. Finally, he drafted the Rhode Island Royal Charter and presented it to the king, and it was approved with the king's seal on 8 July 1663. This charter granted unprecedented freedom and religious liberty to Rhode Islanders and remained in effect for 180 years, making it the longest-lasting constitutional charter in history.

Clarke returned to Rhode Island following his success at procuring the charter; he became very active in civil affairs there, and continued to pastor his church in Newport until his death in 1676. He left an extensive will, setting up the first educational trust in America. He was an avid proponent of the notion of soul-liberty that was included in the Rhode Island charter—and later in the United States Constitution.

== Early life ==
John Clarke was born at Westhorpe in the county of Suffolk, England, and was baptized there on 8 October 1609. He was one of seven children of Thomas Clarke and Rose Kerrich (or Kerridge), six of whom left England and settled in New England. No definitive record has been found concerning his life in England other than the parish records of his baptism and those of his siblings.

Clarke was apparently highly educated, judging from the fact that he arrived in New England at the age of 28 qualified as both a physician and a General Baptist minister. His many years of study become evident through a book that he wrote and published in 1652, and through his masterful authorship of the Rhode Island Royal Charter of 1663; further, his will mentions his Hebrew and Greek books, as well as a concordance and lexicon that he wrote himself.

The difficulty with tracing Clarke's life in England stems largely from his very common name. Rhode Island historian George Andrews Moriarty, Jr wrote that this was probably the same John Clarke who attended St Catharine's College, Cambridge, but he may also have received a bachelor's degree from Brasenose College, Oxford in 1628 and a master's degree there in 1632. Another clue to his education comes from a catalog of students from Leiden University in Holland, one of Europe's primary medical schools at the time. The school's ledger of graduates includes, in Latin, "Johannes Clarcq, Anglus, 17 July 1635-273" (translated as John Clark, England). It is apparent that Clarke earned a master's degree from the concordance that he wrote, where the authorship is given as "John Clarke, Master of Arts".

== Rhode Island ==
Clarke arrived in Boston in the Massachusetts Bay Colony in November 1637 when the colony was in the midst of the major theological and political crisis known as the Antinomian Controversy. A major division had occurred within the Boston church between proponents of so-called "covenant of grace" theology, led by John Cotton, and proponents of so-called "covenant of works", led by John Wilson and others.

The controversy ultimately resulted in many people leaving Massachusetts Bay Colony, either voluntarily or by banishment. Some went north in November 1637 to found the town of Exeter, New Hampshire, while a larger group were uncertain where to go. They contacted Roger Williams, who suggested that they purchase land from the Narragansett people along the Narragansett Bay, near his settlement of Providence Plantations. John Clarke apparently went with both groups, based on what he wrote in his book: "By reason of the suffocating heat of the summer before [1637], I went to the North to be somewhat cooler, but the winter following [1637–38] proved so cold, that we were forced in the spring to make towards the South."

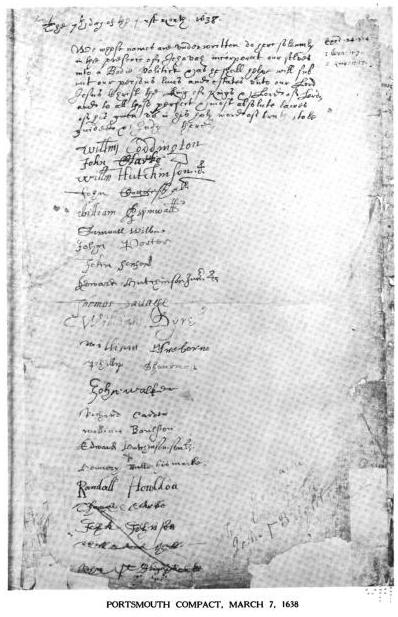
Portsmouth Compact; John Clarke's name is second on the list, just below Coddington's

Clarke joined a group of men at the Boston home of William Coddington on 7 March 1638, and they drafted the Portsmouth Compact. Some historians suggest that Clarke wrote the document, based on its religious sentiment. 23 men signed the document which was intended to form a "Bodie Politick" based on Christian principles, and Coddington was chosen as the leader of the group.

Roger Williams suggested two places where the exiles could settle on the Narraganset Bay: Sowams (which became Barrington and Warren, Rhode Island) and Aquidneck Island (which was called Rhode Island at the time). Williams was uncertain about English claims to these lands, so Clarke led a delegation of three men to Plymouth Colony where he was informed that Sowams was under their jurisdiction but Aquidneck Island was not. This suited Clarke, whose desire for the exiles was to "get clear of all, and be ourselves". Aquidneck was in the territory of the Narragansett people, and Williams suggested that the Colonists pay them for the land with tools, coats, and wampum. On 24 March 1638, Williams drew up the deed granting Aquidneck Island to the settlers, which was signed "at Narragansett" (likely Providence) by sachems Canonicus and Miantonomi, with Williams and Randall Holden as witnesses. The names of many of the settlers were included on the deed; Coddington's name appeared first because he was responsible for the gratuity.

Clarke joined William and Anne Hutchinson and many others in building the new settlement of Pocasset on Aquidneck Island. Within a year, however, there was dissension among the leaders, and Clarke joined Coddington and others in moving to the south end of the island, establishing the town of Newport. On 2 January 1639, Clarke and three others were appointed to survey the new lands around Newport, and they were appointed to proportion it among the inhabitants on 5 June.

In 1640, the towns of Portsmouth and Newport united and Coddington was elected its governor. Roger Williams wanted royal recognition for these settlements and protection against encroachments from their neighbors of Massachusetts, Plymouth, and Connecticut. In 1643, he went to England to obtain a patent bringing all four towns (Newport, Portsmouth, Providence, and Warwick) under one government. Coddington was opposed to the patent because the two island towns had grown and prospered much more than the mainland towns of Providence and Warwick. He managed to keep the island towns separate until 1647 when the four towns finally adopted the patent and became the Colony of Rhode Island and Providence Plantations.

Clarke had some legal training, and historian Albert Henry Newman argued that he was the principal author of the first complete code of laws that was enacted by the fledgling colony in 1647. Rhode Island historian and Lieutenant Governor Samuel G. Arnold extolled the virtues of this code, calling it a model of legislation which has not been surpassed.

== Founding of the Newport church ==
In 1638, Roger Williams established a church in Providence which is now known as the First Baptist Church in America. The next Baptist congregation was established by John Clarke on Rhode Island and likely had its beginnings when he arrived on the island in 1638. Massachusetts Governor John Winthrop wrote that there were "professed Anabaptists" on the island from 1640 to 1641. Boston lawyer Thomas Lechford wrote that there was a church on the island in 1640 of which Clarke was the elder or pastor, but he understood that it had been dissolved. Nevertheless, Clarke conducted public worship in Newport from the time of his arrival until 1644, when a church at Newport was founded. The church remains active as a Particular Baptist church and carries the name of United Baptist Church, John Clarke Memorial in honor of its founder.

== Baptist activism ==
In 1649, Clarke went to Seekonk (then in Plymouth Colony but later in Rehoboth, Massachusetts) to help organize a Baptist church. Roger Williams confirmed this in a letter to Governor Winthrop: "At Seekonk, a great many have lately concurred with Mr. John Clarke, and our Providence men, about the point of a new baptism and the manner by dipping; and Mr. John Clarke hath been there lately, and Mr. Lucar, and hath dipped them. I believe their practice comes nearer to the first practice of our great Founder, Christ Jesus, than other practices of religion do." Several members of the Seekonk church had quarreled with their minister Samuel Newman and had broken off from the main church, largely over the issue of infant baptism. Hearing of this division, Clarke and Lucar went to welcome the dissidents and baptize them by immersion. One of the Seekonk men was Obadiah Holmes who is considered a "pugnacious man [and] a hot-tempered fault-finder" by Clarke biographer Sydney James.

The Massachusetts clergymen and magistrates were angered when they learned of the Seekonk baptisms. In their eyes, they invalidated the earlier baptisms which the parishioners had undergone as children, and also invalidated the ministers who performed them. The magistrates wrote to their counterparts in Plymouth accusing them of doing nothing about the practices. The Seekonk church then excommunicated Holmes and he was compelled to move to Newport in 1650 or 1651 with a few other dissidents, following court action against him. He subsequently became an elder of the Newport church.

=== Imprisonment ===
Governor Endicott said that Clarke and his company deserved death

William Witter was an elderly blind man with Baptist sentiments who was living in Lynn, Massachusetts in July 1651. He wanted to connect with his Baptist faith, but he was too infirm to travel to Newport, so Clarke, Obadiah Holmes, and John Crandall visited him at his home. The party arrived on Saturday 19 July and held a religious service the next day. Those present included family and visitors and "four or five strangers that came in unexpected". During the service, two constables appeared with a warrant signed by local magistrate Robert Bridge calling for the arrest of Clarke and his two associates. No baptisms had been performed, but the wording of the warrant suggested that this was the reason for the men's arrest. The men were forced to attend a Puritan religious service against their will, and they refused to remove their hats in church. Clarke stood at the end of the service and explained to the congregation why they refused to remove their hats. The men were detained that evening, then brought before the local magistrates the following day. They were free to return to Witter's after being arraigned and before being taken to Boston. Clarke conducted a service and Holmes baptized three people.

The prisoners were taken to Boston on 22 July and held until their trial on 31 July. They were brought before Governor John Endicott for questioning and were accused of being Anabaptists. Clarke replied that he was neither an Anabaptist, nor a Pedobaptist (one favoring infant baptism), nor a Catabaptist (one opposing infant baptism). The governor said that the three men "deserved death, and he would not have such trash brought into his jurisdiction."

John Clarke's Four Religious Principles

First, that ... Jesus Christ is ... the Lord: none to or with him by way of commanding and ordering, with respect to the worship of God, the household of faith.

Second, baptism, or dipping in water, is one of the commandments of this Lord Jesus Christ, and that a visible believer or disciple of Christ Jesus—that is, one that manifesteth repentance toward God, and faith in Jesus Christ—is the only person that is to be baptized, or dipped with that visible baptism.

Third, every such believer in Christ Jesus ... may in point of liberty, yea, ought in point of duty, to improve that talent his Lord hath given unto him, and in the congregation ... may speak by way of prophecy for the edification, exhortation, and comfort of the whole.

Fourth, that no such believer or servant of Christ Jesus hath liberty, much less authority from his Lord to smite his fellow-servant, nor yet with outward force, or arm of flesh to constrain, or restrain his conscience, no, nor yet his outward man for conscience' sake, or worship of his God, where injury is not offered to the person, name, or estate of others.

— John Clarke Four Religious Principles

During the trial, the court was represented by Governor Endicott, Deputy Governor Thomas Dudley, and magistrates Richard Bellingham, William Hibbins, and Increase Nowell. The Reverend John Cotton weighed in with denunciation for the prisoners, and the Reverend John Wilson struck Holmes while he was in the protection of the court. The men were charged with: (1) holding an unauthorized religious meeting; (2) disrupting an authorized meeting (wearing their hats); (3) administering sacraments illegally; (4) maintaining that the Massachusetts churches were not true churches; and (5) maintaining that infant baptism was false baptism. The men were sentenced without any accuser or witness speaking out against them.

The outcome of the trial was that Holmes was fined £30, Clarke £20, and Crandall £5. Holmes had been given the heaviest fine because of his excommunication in Seekonk and for administering the baptisms in Lynn. Clarke protested their heavy fines, and Governor Endicott replied that Clarke "was worthy to be hanged." In court, Endicott told Clarke that his beliefs would not stand up to those of the Puritan ministers. Clarke responded to this by writing a letter to the court from prison the following day, accepting the implied challenge to have a debate with the Puritan ministers on religious beliefs and practices. The challenge was initially accepted, but Clarke's fine was paid by some friends without his knowledge and he was released from jail. He left the area, and was then accused by the Puritan elders of defaulting on the challenge. He made two more attempts to debate the Puritan clergy, but the case was dropped by the court and the debate never took place. Clarke had drafted four points of discussion which detailed his beliefs and position.

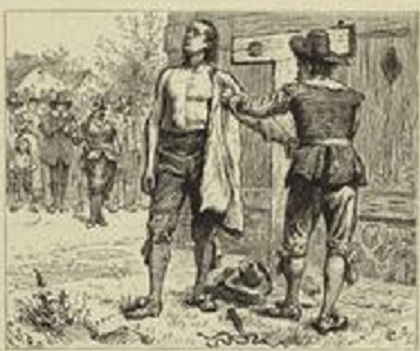
Clarke was heavily fined, while the defiant Obadiah Holmes was whipped in Boston in 1651

Friends raised the money to pay the fines for Clarke and Crandall, but without their consent and contrary to their wishes. As soon as Holmes discovered what was happening, he was able to forbid the payment of his fine as a matter of conscience, though friends attempted to pay for him as well. As a result, Holmes was taken to the town's whipping post on 5 September 1651 and given 30 lashes with a three-corded whip. He told the magistrates, "You have struck me as with roses", and he claimed to have felt no pain during the incident; however, he could only sleep by resting on his knees and elbows for many days afterwards. Much later, Rhode Island Governor Joseph Jenckes wrote, "Those who have seen the scars on Mr. Holmes' back (which the old man was wont to call the marks of the Lord Jesus), have expressed a wonder that he should live."

=== Aftermath ===
Following the men's arrest and ill treatment, Sir Richard Saltonstall wrote from England to Reverends Cotton and Wilson of the Boston church: "These rigid wayes have lay'd you very lowe in the hearts of the saynts." Shortly after the incident, Roger Williams wrote a letter to Governor Endicott, making an earnest plea for toleration in matters of conscience and religion, but the request was unheeded. However, Williams did not let the matter rest, and used Clarke and Holmes as the subjects of his book The Bloody Tenent Yet More Bloody (1652). Williams gave a copy of this book to Clarke and wrote in the front: "For his honoured and beloved Mr. John Clarke, an eminent witnes of Christ Jesus ag'st ye bloodie Doctrine of persecution, &c."

One positive outcome of the ordeal endured by these men was the conversion and baptism of some of the witnesses. One such witness was Henry Dunster, the first president of Harvard College. Dunster's conversion in faith resulted in his removal as president in 1654, but helped inspire the creation of the First Baptist Church of Boston. Some scholars have argued that Clarke's mission trip was planned to provoke the Massachusetts officials in order to support the cause of Rhode Island in England. Shortly after Clarke arrived in England, he published Ill Newes from New-England, documenting the ordeal at the hands of the Massachusetts authorities. The book was an appeal to the English government outlining the case for religious tolerance, and it was instrumental in shaping public opinion and generating support for a charter for the Rhode Island colony.

== Time in England ==
William Coddington was unhappy with the colonial patent that Roger Williams had obtained in 1643, and he was resistant to consolidating the four settlements into the unified Colony of Rhode Island and Providence Plantations, which ultimately came about in 1647 as a result of the patent. He wanted colonial independence for the two island towns of Newport and Portsmouth, and decided to go to England to present his case to the Colonial Commissioners in London. On 3 April 1651, the Council of State of England gave Coddington the commission of a separate government for the island of Aquidneck and for the smaller neighboring island of Conanicut (later Jamestown, Rhode Island), with him as governor for life.

=== Repeal of Coddington Commission ===
Criticism arose as soon as Coddington returned to Rhode Island with his commission. In September 1651, William Arnold summed up the feelings of many of the Providence settlers when he wrote, "Whereas Mr. Coddington have gotten a charter of Road Iland and Conimacuke Iland to himself, he have thereby broken the force of their charter that went under the name of Providence, because he have gotten away the greater part of that colonie." Clarke voiced his opposition to Coddington's rule of the island, and he was commissioned as the island's agent to England on 15 October 1651. The following month, he and William Dyer were sent to England to get the Coddington commission revoked. Simultaneously, the mainland towns of Providence and Warwick sent Roger Williams on a similar errand, and the three men sailed for England in November 1651, just a few months after Clarke had been released from prison. The men did not meet with the Council of State on New England until April 1652 because of recent hostilities between the English and the Dutch.

Coddington's commission for the island government was revoked in October 1652, with the help of Henry Vane. William Dyer returned to Rhode Island the following February, bringing the news of the return of the colony to the Williams Patent of 1643, but Clarke remained in England with his wife.

=== Ill Newes from New England ===
Very soon after arriving in England, Clarke published Ill Newes from New England: or a Narrative of New England's Persecution^{[a]} (1652). The book begins with a letter to the English Parliament and Council of State, conveying an earnest plea for liberty of conscience and religious toleration. This is followed by another letter addressed to the Puritan leaders in Massachusetts. The largest part of the book is devoted to Clarke's beliefs on conducting a church and why he thought that the Massachusetts churches were proceeding in the wrong direction. Less than half of the book concerns the persecution that Clarke and his companions experienced at the hands of the Massachusetts authorities. He wrote, "it is not the will of the Lord that any one should have dominion over another man's conscience. ... [Conscience] is such a sparkling beam from the Father of lights and spirits that it cannot be lorded over, commanded, or forced, either by men, devils, or angels."

The book ultimately had the desired effect. The Massachusetts authorities became so alarmed over the contents of Ill Newes that Thomas Cobbet, the minister of the Lynn church, wrote a rebuttal entitled The Civil Magistrates Power in Matters of Religion Modestly Debated (1653). This book defended the use of force to maintain the "correct" church in the Massachusetts colony. This response was well written, but it did more to confirm the persecutions of Clarke's party than to defend the Massachusetts position. Ultimately, the book helped Rhode Island secure significant religious liberties, prompting one Baptist historian to describe Clarke as "the Baptist drum major for freedom in seventeenth century America."

=== Rhode Island agent ===
Clarke was Rhode Island's official agent in England, although he received little compensation for his work. However, he remained active in his religious commitment and attended the Particular Baptist church in London under the leadership of William Kiffin. One of his means of support was preaching at this church, which he called his "cheefe place for proffitt and preference", possibly because this arrangement offered him room and board. He also offered legal services and practiced medicine in London.

Most of Clarke's time in England was during the Interregnum, when rule of the country was under Parliament and Oliver Cromwell as the Lord Protector. Clarke's primary purpose there was to secure a strengthened charter for the Colony of Rhode Island and Providence Plantations ensuring the religious liberties on which the colony had been founded, and Cromwell confirmed the validity of Rhode Island's 1643 patent. Clarke also assisted the colony in 1656 by sending home four barrels of powder and eight barrels of shot and bullets, and in 1657 he handled a letter from the colony requesting assistance with legal proceedings against William Harris.

An important acquaintance of Clarke's in London was Richard Baily, who provided him with legal expertise, helped him draft petitions to the king, and may have even helped him write Rhode Island's charter. When Clarke eventually returned to Newport, Baily sailed with him, later providing additional legal counsel and writing Clarke's extensive will.

=== Negotiating a charter ===
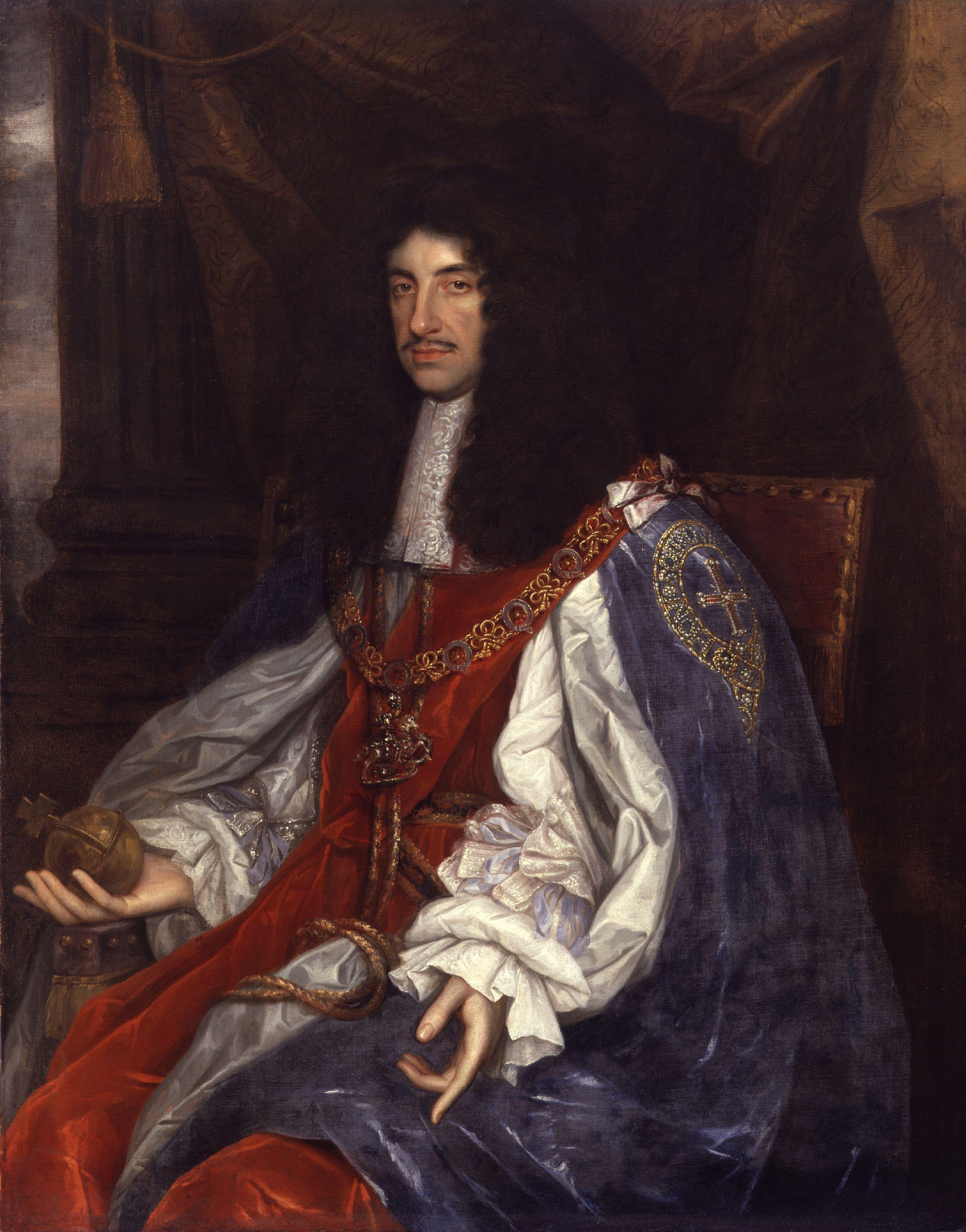
Charles II of England received at least ten petitions and letters from Clarke before affixing his seal on the Rhode Island Royal Charter.

In 1660, Charles II ascended the throne of England, and within two years the Act of Uniformity was passed requiring unified religious observances centered on the Anglican Church. The new king harbored prejudices against the Presbyterians, Independents, and Baptists, increasing Clarke's difficulty in crafting a charter that included religious freedoms. Clarke's commission as the agent for Rhode Island was renewed on 18 October 1660, and he filed at least ten petitions and letters to the king between 1661 and 1662. He offered the king the complete loyalty of the Rhode Island colony, and then requested the king's sympathy and support to guarantee freedom of conscience in the pursuit of religious worship.

Clarke wrote a particularly eloquent proposal in a petition received by the crown on 5 February 1661, with certain words emboldened within the document. His earnest request was "TO HOLD FORTH A LIVELY EXPERIMENT THAT A MOST FLOURISHING CIVILL STATE MAY STAND ... AND BEST BE MAINTAYNED ... WITH A FULL LIBERTIE IN RELIGIOUS CONCERNMENTS". These words became emblematic of Rhode Island's struggle for religious freedom and were soon included in the charter itself—and much later were chiseled on the frieze of the Rhode Island State House. One of the later petitions dealt heavily with the boundary issues between the Rhode Island and Connecticut colonies. Clarke had to wait nearly a year for any action on the various petitions.

An unforeseen emergency occurred in the spring of 1662 when Connecticut Colony Governor John Winthrop, Jr. was given an audience with the king ahead of Clarke, and he obtained a new charter for his colony. Winthrop was on good terms with many Rhode Islanders, but he also had a stake in the Atherton Company, which undermined the sovereignty of Rhode Island by buying large tracts of land from the Narragansett people west of the Narraganset Bay, where Rhode Island claimed the territory. Clarke regarded Winthrop's conduct as treacherous, and Winthrop avoided Clarke while in England; he was able to get his charter approved in May 1662.

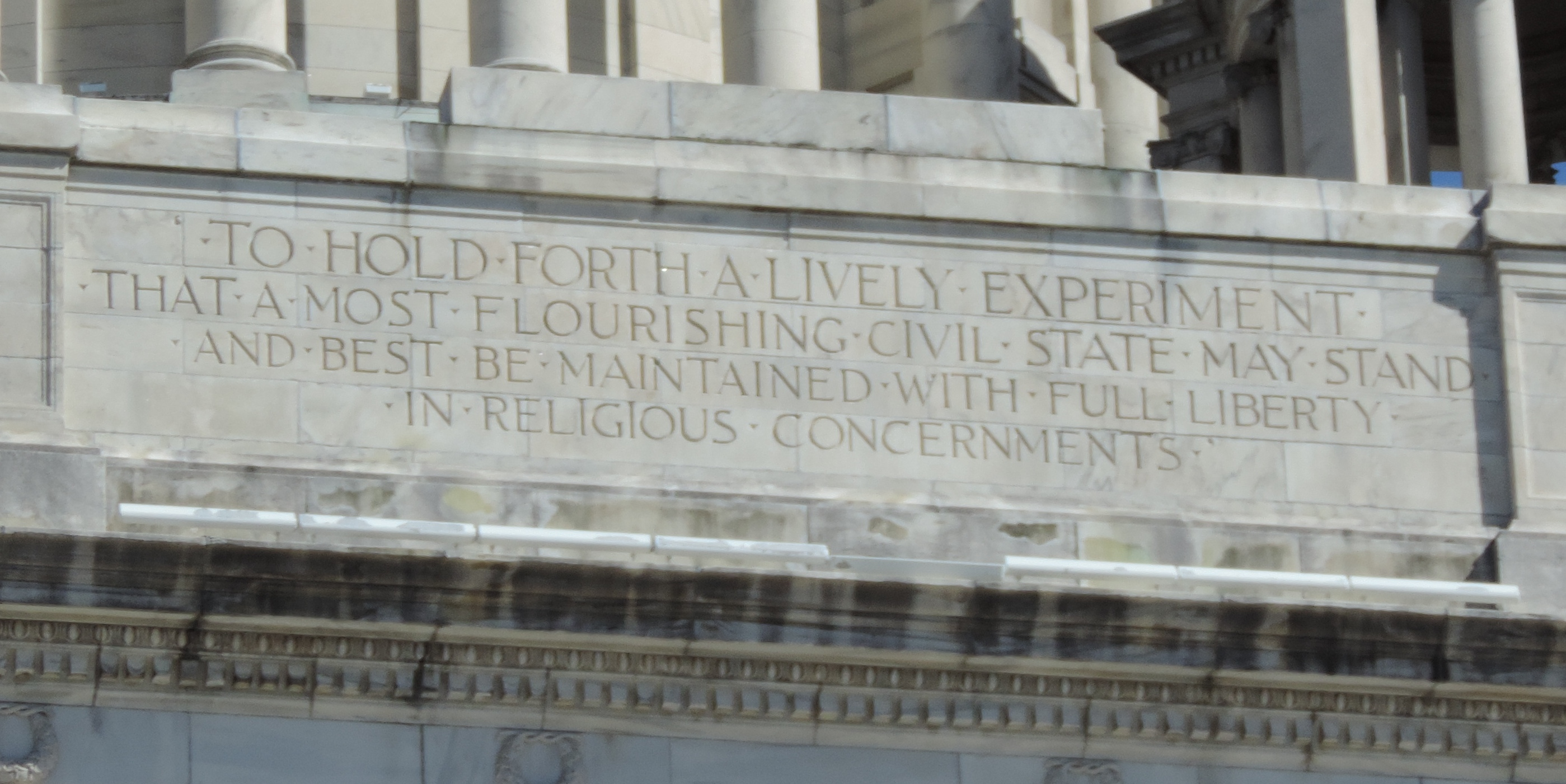
Quotation of John Clarke on the frieze of the Rhode Island Statehouse in Providence

The Earl of Clarendon recognized the conflict between Connecticut and Rhode Island. He summoned Winthrop and Clarke in July 1662, representing the king in hopes of settling the boundary dispute between the two colonies. Both colonies claimed the territory between the Pawcatuck River and the Narragansett Bay. The boundary line between the two colonies was ultimately set at the Pawcatuck River, after months of negotiations involving lawyers and arbitrators on both sides. Those who had settled on Atherton Company lands were allowed to choose whether to be governed by Connecticut or Rhode Island. Once the agreement was reached, Winthrop returned to New England while Clarke made his final push for Rhode Island's charter.

Following all the furore over the land boundaries, none of the other provisions of the proposed charter aroused any debate. Many of the provisions of Rhode Island's charter were like those in Connecticut's, except that Connecticut wanted a government similar to that of Massachusetts, while Rhode Island wanted the same self-government of the freemen that had been granted earlier in the 1643 patent. However, the Rhode Island charter went much further in its guarantees of religious freedom.

== Rhode Island's Royal Charter ==
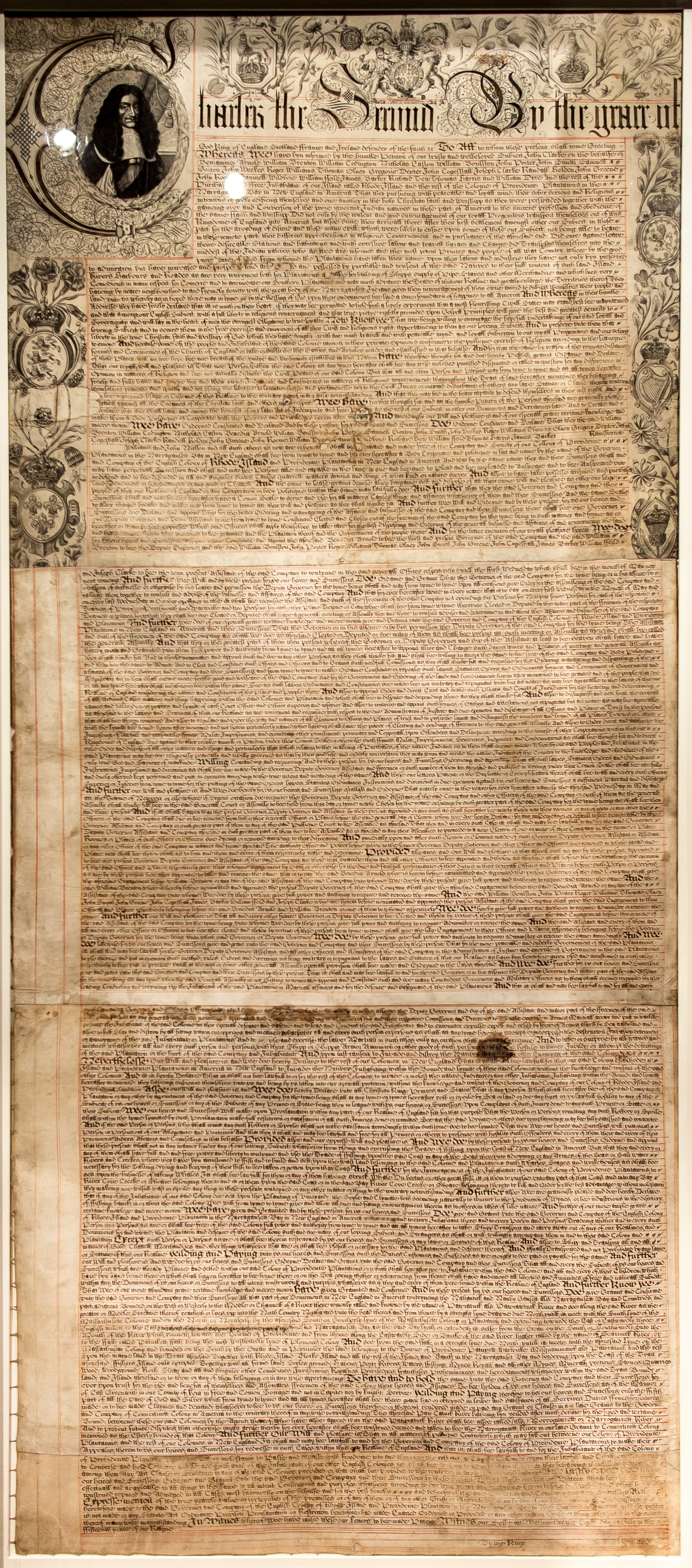
The Rhode Island Royal Charter of 1663 was written by Clarke.

Once the boundary issue between Rhode Island and Connecticut was resolved, the long-awaited charter, drafted by Clarke, was given the king's seal on 8 July 1663. The document was remarkable in that it not only offered corporate powers beyond what most English bureaucrats thought prudent, but offered a degree of religious freedom without precedent. The provisions of this charter were so far-reaching that not only would Rhode Island proceed as an autonomous entity, but the document would remain in effect for 180 years.

In this charter, colonial boundaries were outlined, provisions for a military and for prosecuting war were effected, fishing privileges were secured, and a means of appeal to England was detailed. The charter guaranteed the rights of Rhode Island residents to travel freely within the other colonies, which rights had been curtailed due to religious reasons in the past. The new charter also forbade the other New England colonies from making war against the Indians within Rhode Island, without its permission, and also directed that disputes with other colonies would be appealed to the crown. It also outlined provisions for colonial representation, specifying a colonial governor, deputy governor, and ten assistants (called magistrates because of their judicial role). In addition, the number of deputies allotted to each town was specified.

Of paramount importance to Clarke was the charter's explicit guarantee of religious freedom. It excused Rhode Islanders from conformity with the Anglican Church "because some of the people ... cannot, in their private Opinions, conform to the publique exercise of religion ..." It also took some of the language from the Declaration of Breda:

that no person within the said colony, at any time hereafter shall be any wise molested [harassed], punished, disquieted, or called in question, for any differences in opinion in matters of religion, and do not actually disturb the civil peace of our said colony; but that all and every person and persons may, from time to time, and at all times hereafter, freely and fully have and enjoy his and their own judgments and consciences, in matters of religious concernments, throughout the tract of land hereafter mentioned, they behaving themselves peaceable and quietly ...

Once he had the cherished document in hand, it was imperative for Clarke to get it sent to Rhode Island. However, he had received very little remuneration for his diplomatic efforts and did not have the funds to immediately sail back to New England. He therefore entrusted the charter to Captain George Baxter, who carried it to Rhode Island. On 24 November 1663 Rhode Island's General Court of Commissioners convened at Newport for the last time under the parliamentary patent of 1643. The inhabitants and legislators had gathered to receive the result of Clarke's decade-long labors. The magnitude and solemnity of the occasion was captured in the colonial records:

At a very great meeting and assembly of the freemen of the colony of Providence Plantation, at Newport, in Rhode Island, in New England, November the 24th, 1663. The abovesayed Assembly being legally called and orderly mett for the sollome reception of his Majestyes gratious letter pattent unto them sent, and having in order thereto chosen the President, Benedict Arnold, Moderator of the Assembly, [it was] Voted: That the box in which the King's gratious letters were enclosed be opened, and the letters with the broad seale thereto affixed be taken forth and read by Captayne George Baxter in the audience and view of all the people; which was accordingly done, and the sayd letters with his Majesty's Royall Stampe, and the broad seal, with much becoming gravity held up on hygh, and presented to the perfect view of the people, and then returned into the box and locked up by the Governor, in order to the safe keeping of it.

The following day it was voted that words of humble thanks be delivered to the King and also to the Earl of Clarendon, and that a £100 gratuity be given to Clarke. The charter stood the test of time, and it wasn't until 1843, 180 years after its creation, that the charter was finally replaced by the Constitution of Rhode Island, and only for the one reason that the apportionment of representatives for the several towns "could no longer be rendered as just in operation and could only be remedied by alteration of the organic law." When the document was ultimately retired, it was the longest surviving constitutional charter in the world. It was so far-reaching that even the American Revolutionary War did not change its position, since both the revolution and the charter rested on the same foundation—the inherent right of self-government.

== Later life ==
With the royal charter ready to travel to New England, Clarke had to begin gathering funds to get himself back as well. Only a week after the king put his seal on the charter, Clarke made an indenture with Richard Deane of London, mortgaging his Newport properties to raise money. Even this didn't ensure his immediate departure from England, and it wasn't until the following spring that he was able to make the voyage back to Rhode Island. He and his wife sailed aboard The Sisters of London, carrying their belongings and a shipment of armaments for the colony.

Despite the magnanimous provisions of Rhode Island's charter, it did not definitively settle the land disputes with Connecticut, which would continue for more than half a century. Nor did it settle the issue with the Atherton Company, occupying two large tracts of land within Rhode Island's "Narragansett country". Fortuitous for the Rhode Island colony, however, was the arrival in 1664 of a group of royal commissioners. Samuel Gorton had told the crown that in 1644 the Narragansett people had submitted themselves to England's king. Once the newly arrived commissioners verified this, they declared all of the Narragansett territory (what is now Washington County and a part of Kent County, Rhode Island, including the Atherton tracts), to be Kings Province. One of the commissioners was Samuel Maverick, a good friend of Rhode Island's recent governor William Brenton, who abhorred the Atherton Company. Clarke was one of three men allowed to present Rhode Island's views on the land disputes, and the commissioners ultimately took a strong stance in favor of Rhode Island. Eventually, the Atherton Company lost its Narragansett property, and the Kings Province became a part of the Rhode Island colony.

=== Civil roles ===
Following his great usefulness in England, Clarke became further involved in the affairs of the Rhode Island colony upon his return. He served for six years, from 1664 to 1671, as a Deputy from Newport in the General Assembly, and then served as the Deputy Governor under Governor Benedict Arnold for two of the three years between 1669 and 1672. With his legal background, he was appointed in October 1666 to make a digest of Rhode Island laws. In June 1670 and again in March 1672 he was chosen as an agent to go back to England on behalf of the colony. His selection in 1672 was to make an appeal to the king because of incursions that the Connecticut Colony was making into the territory of Rhode Island, but the plan to send him was abandoned.

From 1675 to 1676, Rhode Island became embroiled in King Philip's War, considered "the most disastrous conflict to ever devastate New England," and leaving the mainland towns of the colony in ruins. This confrontation between many indigenous people and the English settlers was named for Metacomet, sachem of the Wampanoags, who had been given the English name of King Philip. Though Rhode Island was much more at peace with the Indians than the other colonies, because of geography, it took the brunt of damage from the conflict, and the settlements of Warwick and Pawtuxet were totally destroyed, with much of Providence ruined as well. Because of the very high esteem Clarke held within the colony, he was one of 16 colonial leaders whose counsel was sought in a 4 April 1676 General Assembly resolution. Two weeks later, while the war was still raging, Clarke was dead.

=== Church divisions ===
While Clarke became very active in the affairs of the colony upon his return from England, he also resumed his leadership role in the Newport church. One major division occurred in the church while he was in England, and another several years after his return. The first of these concerned the "laying on of hands". This practice was considered to be one of Christ's six principles as advocated in the biblical verse Hebrews 6:2, and the ritual was welcomed in the Newport church. However, some members of the church wanted the practice to be mandatory, while others did not want additional restrictions placed on the parishioners. This disagreement prompted William Vaughan to break away from the church in 1656 and form the Six Principle Baptist Church in Newport, sometimes called the Second Baptist Church of Newport.

The second major division in the church occurred over the day of worship, when Saturday Sabbatarians within the congregation wanted to worship on Saturday. The practice was largely tolerated, with some parishioners attending one service, some attending another, and some attending both. The elder Obadiah Holmes, however, was hostile to the practice, and was rebuked by Clarke in 1667 over his harshness towards these Sabbatarians. Holmes subsequently withdrew from preaching at the Newport church, but resumed his office there in 1671. When he continued to be critical of the Saturday Sabbatarians, they finally left to form their own church in December 1671. Additional dissension occurred in the church, centered on the family of Giles Slocum. When Slocum's wife, Joan, denied that Christ was alive, she was excommunicated in 1673. Following this, her husband, their children, and their children's spouses all left the church, and became Quakers.

== Death and legacy ==
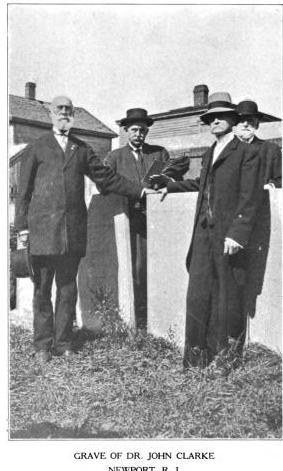
Historian Thomas W. Bicknell and others in front of Clarke's grave marker in Newport

With the help of Richard Baily, Clarke drafted his will on 20 April 1676, then died in Newport the same day. He was buried in his family plot in Newport, as directed in his will, beside his two wives, Elizabeth and Jane, who predeceased him.

In his will he set up a trust to be used "for the relief of the poor or bringing up of children unto learning from time to time forever." Still in use, this trust is generally considered to be the oldest educational trust fund in the United States. Ironically, the trust undermined some of the principles that Clarke cherished, particularly the separation between church and state. While the trust was used to support ministries of the church, it enmeshed the town counsel and the church in many legal entanglements. Eventually the trust was used to pay, at least in part, the salary of a paid minister—something that Clarke thought to be highly inappropriate.

Clarke believed that secular government should peacefully coexist with religion, and he became a seminal figure in applying the separation of church and state. Historian Thomas Bicknell, one of Clarke's most ardent supporters, wrote that at the time of the Puritan settlement of New England that "nowhere on the face of the earth and among civilized men, did civil and soul-liberty exist. Its first clear, full, deliberate, organized and permanent establishment in the world can now be distinctly traced to the Colony of Rhode Island, on the island of Aquidneck, in the Narragansett Bay, under the leadership and inspiration of Dr.^{[b]} John Clarke, the true Founder". Historian Louis Asher wrote, "It hardly seems arguable that Dr. Clarke was the first one to bring democracy to the New World by means of Rhode Island." Bicknell also asserted that Clarke was the "recognized founder and father of the Aquidneck Plantations, the author of the Compact of Portsmouth and leading spirit in the organization and administration of the island towns. Historian Edward Peterson wrote that Clarke was a man "whose moral character has never been surpassed, and his piety never been questioned." Asher made this final assessment of Clarke: "As a man, Clarke lived for others. Like many men of the past, he was selfless and uncomplaining. Despite his sectarian religious views, he gave more for his fellow man than he received."

The First Baptist Church of Newport, a grammar school, and a merchant Liberty ship, the SS John Clarke, are named for Clarke. The Physical Sciences building at Rhode Island College was dedicated in his honor in 1963. A plaque on the wall of the Newport Historical Society reads:

Erected by the Newport Medical Society
December 1885
To
John Clarke, Physician
1609–1676
Founder of Newport
And of the Civil Polity of Rhode Island

== Ancestry and family ==
John Clarke was the fifth of seven known children born to Thomas and Rose Clarke, all born or baptized at Westhorpe, Suffolk, England. Margaret was the oldest child, born about 1601, and next was Carew, baptized 17 February 1602/3, followed by Thomas, baptized 31 March 1605. Mary was next, baptized 26 July 1607, then the subject John was baptized 8 October 1609, next was William baptized 11 February 1611 who probably died young, and the youngest, Joseph, was baptized on 16 December 1618. Margaret married Nicholas Wyeth and lived in Cambridge, Massachusetts. Mary married John Peckham, and came to Newport, Rhode Island with her husband and four brothers, Carew, Thomas, John, and Joseph.

John Clarke was married three times, his first wife being Elizabeth Harris, the daughter of John Harris who was lord of the manor of Wrestlingworth in Bedfordshire. This was the wife who was with him while he was an agent in England, and she died in Newport a few years before Clarke. Following her death, he was married on 1 February 1671 to Jane, the widow of Nicholas Fletcher, but she died the following year on 19 April 1672. Clarke had a daughter with Jane, born 14 February 1672 and dying on 18 May 1673.

Clarke's third wife was Sarah, the widow of Nicholas Davis, with whom Clarke had had a long association. Davis, like Clarke, had been an early settler of Aquidneck Island in 1639, but became a merchant and moved to Hyannis in the Plymouth Colony. Davis had many business dealings in Massachusetts, but when he became a Quaker, he was imprisoned and banished from there in 1659, and later lived in Newport. He transported Quaker founder George Fox from Long Island to Newport in 1672, during Fox's visit to the American colonies. Soon thereafter Davis drowned, and within a year and a half his widow married Clarke. Sarah survived Clarke, and died sometime about 1692. She had children who were remembered in Clarke's will.

== See also ==
- List of early settlers of Rhode Island
- List of lieutenant governors of Rhode Island
- Colony of Rhode Island and Providence Plantations

== Notes ==
a. The complete title of Clarke's book is Ill Newes from New-England: Or a Narrative of New-Englands Persecution. Wherin is Declared that While Old England is Becoming New, New-England is Become Old. Also Four Proposals to the Honoured Parliament and Councel of State, Touching the Way to Propagate the Gospel of Christ (with Small Charge and Great Safety) Both in Old England and New. Also Christ out of His Last Will and Testament, Confirmed and Justified (London: Henry Hills, 1652)

b. The title of Dr. has been given to John Clarke by many authors, because he was a physician. However, he was not a doctor of medicine in the modern sense, even though he had medical training and education. The title has not been used in this article, other than in quotations.
