= Qalandar Kashteh =

Qalandar Kashteh قلندركشته
- Village
- Country: Iran
- Province: Fars
- County: Neyriz
- Bakhsh: Central
- Rural District: Horgan

Population (2006)
  - Total: 36
- Time zone: UTC+3:30 (IRST)
  - Summer (DST): UTC+4:30 (IRDT)

Qalandar Kashteh (Persian: قلندركشته) is a village in Horgan Rural District, in the Central District of Neyriz County, Fars province, Iran. At the 2006 census, its population was 36, in 8 families.
