= Qalandar, Kurdistan =

Qalandar قلندر
- Village
- Location within Iran
- Coordinates: 36°23′32″N 46°28′52″E
- Country: Iran
- Province: Kurdistan
- County: Saqqez
- Bakhsh: Central
- Rural District: Sara

Population (2006)
  - Total: 480
- Time zone: UTC+3:30 (IRST)
  - Summer (DST): UTC+4:30 (IRDT)

Qalandar (Persian: قلندر) is a village in Sara Rural District, in the Central District of Saqqez County, Kurdistan Province, Iran. At the 2006 census, its population was 480, in 105 families. The village is populated by Kurds.
