= Reg Callender =

English footballer

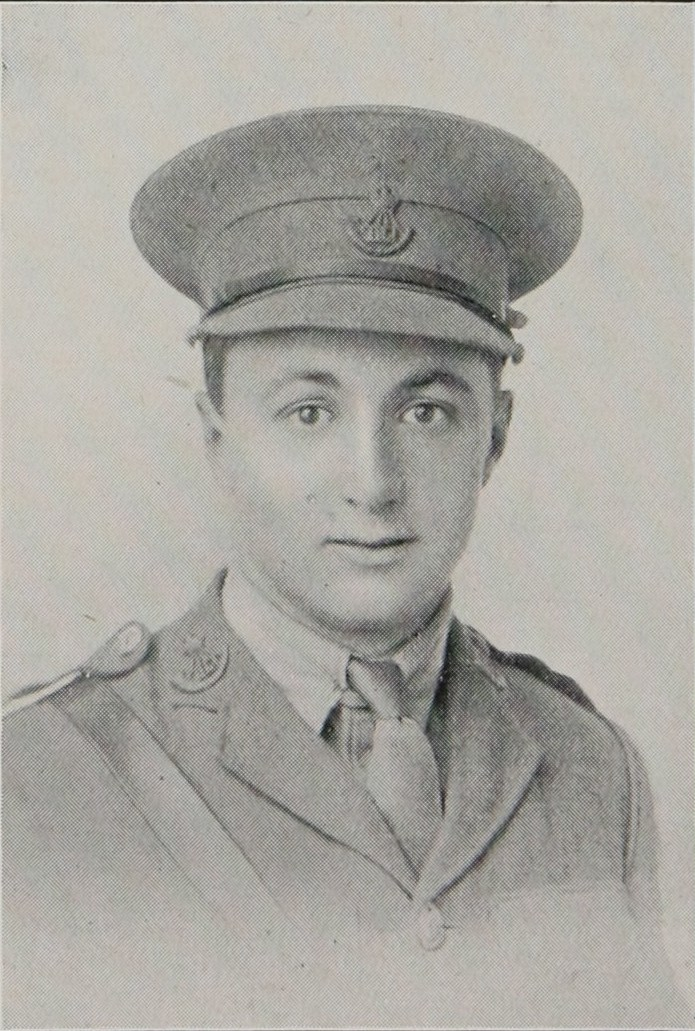

Personal information
- Full name: Reginald Henry Callender
- Date of birth: 31 August 1892
- Place of birth: Bishopton, England
- Date of death: 5 October 1915 (aged 23)
- Place of death: Nord, France
- Position: Outside left

Senior career*
Years	Team	Apps	(Gls)
- St John's College
- Stockton
1912	Glossop	1	(0)
1913–1914	Derby County	5	(0)

International career
1913–1914	England Amateurs	5	(0)
- * Club domestic league appearances and goals

Reginald Henry Callender (31 August 1892 – 5 October 1915) was an English amateur footballer who played in the Football League for Derby County and Glossop as an outside left. He represented the England amateur national team.

== Personal life ==
Callender attended Fitzwilliam and St John's Colleges and was a Cambridge Blue. Prior to the First World War, he worked as a teacher. On 4 December 1914, three months after the outbreak of the First World War, Callender was commissioned as a temporary second lieutenant in the Durham Light Infantry. He was deployed to France in August 1915 and was killed accidentally while explaining the mechanisms of a grenade in Nord on 5 October 1915. He was buried in Cite Bonjean Military Cemetery, Armentières.

== Career statistics ==
Appearances and goals by club, season and competition
Club	Season	League			FA Cup		Total	
Club	Season	Division	Apps	Goals	Apps	Goals	Apps	Goals
Derby County	1913–14	First Division	5	0	0	0	5	0
Career total			5	0	0	0	5	0
