= Qalandar-e Sofla =

Qalandar-e Sofla قلندرسفلي
- Village
- Location within Iran
- Coordinates: 33°38′39″N 46°38′16″E
- Country: Iran
- Province: Ilam
- County: Sirvan
- Bakhsh: Karezan
- Rural District: Zangvan

Population (2006)
  - Total: 73
- Time zone: UTC+3:30 (IRST)
  - Summer (DST): UTC+4:30 (IRDT)

Qalandar-e Sofla (Persian: قلندرسفلي, also Romanized as Qalandar-e Soflá) is a village in Zangvan Rural District, Karezan District, Sirvan County, Ilam Province, Iran. At the 2006 census, its population was 73, in 16 families. The village is populated by Kurds.
