= Don Callander =

American novelist

- Born: March 23, 1930; Minnesota, United States
- Died: July 26, 2008 (aged 78); Orange City, Florida, United States
- Spouse(s): Margaret Callander (unknown–2008); Mary Lee Omohundro (1952–unknown)
- Children: 4
- Writing career
- Period: 1992–2000
- Genre: Fantasy

Donald Bruce Callander (March 23, 1930 – July 26, 2008) was an American fantasy novel author, photographer, editor and graphic artist. He authored Pyromancer, a tale of young wizard-in-training Douglas Brightglade, and fourteen other novels.

== Personal ==
Born in Minnesota, Callander joined the U.S. Navy after high school, serving four years of active duty during the Korean War, and then 20 years in the U.S. Naval Reserve. In 1952, Callander married Mary Lee Omohundro and moved to Washington, D.C., where he began a 30-year career as a writer, photographer, editor and graphic artist with the American Automobile Association.

Following his retirement, Callander settled with his second wife, Margaret, in Orange City, Florida, where he died on Friday, July 26, 2008.

== Books ==
(All books published/reissued by Mundania Press 2013/2014)

- Teddybear, Teddybear (2014)
- Star Warrior (2014)
- The Last Cruise of the USS Pocahontas (2014)

=== Mancer series ===
- Pyromancer (1992)
- Aquamancer (1993)
- Geomancer (1994)
- Aeromancer (1997)
- Marbleheart (1998)
- The Reluctant Knight (2014)

=== Dragon Companion series ===
- Dragon Companion (1994)
- Dragon Rescue (1995)
- Dragon Tempest (1998)
- Dragon Winter (2014)

=== Warlock series ===
- Warlock's Bar & Grille (2000)
- Warlock's All & Sundry (2014)
