= Claire Callender =

British academic (1954–2025)

- Born: April 1954
- Died: 15 April 2025 (aged 71)
- Occupation(s): Academic and professor
- Known for: Awarded an OBE for services to higher education in 2017

Claire Callender OBE (April 1954 – 15 April 2025) was a British academic who was Professor of Higher Education Studies, UCL Institute of Education, University of London, from 2010, and founding deputy director of the Centre for Global Higher Education (CGHE).

== Life and career ==
Callender was born in April 1954. She studied at Notting Hill and Ealing High School from 1961 to 1972. Following a stint working as a community organiser at the Beit She’an Community Centre in Israel, she earned a BSc in Social Administration and Sociology from the University of Bristol in 1979. She later completed a PhD in Gender and Social Policy at the University of Wales in 1988.

Her doctoral research focused on the topic of Women's employment, redundancy and unemployment, marking the beginning of an academic interest in gender issues and the graduate labour market. She held academic positions at University College Cardiff, and subsequently at the Universities of Leeds, Bradford, and Sussex, the latter within the Institute of Employment Studies. Between 1994 and 1998, she led the Family Finances Research Group at the Policy Studies Institute in London. In 1998, she was appointed Professor of Social Policy at London South Bank University, where she worked until 2008.

During the early years of the Blair government, from 1999 to 2000, she was seconded to the Cabinet Office, serving as Head of Research in the Women's Unit and participating in the senior management team.

Callender researched on student finance, an issues including the "effects of tuition debt on graduate financial and life decisions".

In 2017, she received an OBE. In 2023, she was elected a member of the Academia Europaea. She died due to lung cancer at home on 15 April 2025, at the age of 71.

== Selected books ==
- Hunt, S., Callender, C., and Parry, G. (2016) The entry and experience of private providers of higher education in six countries, Centre for Global Higher Education, UCL Institute of Education.
- Temple, P., Callender, C., Grove, L., and Kersh, N. (2014) Managing the student experience in a shifting higher education landscape, York: The Higher Education Academy
- Callender, C., Hawkins, E., Jackson, S., Jamieson, A., Land, H., and Smith, H.(2014) ‘Walking tall’: A critical assessment of new ways of involving student mothers in higher education London: Nuffield Foundation
- Callender, C. and Scott, P. (eds) (2013) Browne and beyond: Modernizing English Higher Education, London: Institute of Education Press, Bedford Way Papers.
- Heller, D and Callender, C (eds) (2013) Student Financing of Higher Education: A Comparative Perspective, International Studies in Higher Education Routledge, London
- Callender, C and Wilkinson, D (2013) Futuretrack: Part-Time Higher Education Students Two Years After Graduating – The Impact of Learning Manchester: HECSU.
