= Callendar =

Callendar is a title of Scottish nobility and a surname. It may refer to:

- Earl of Callendar
  - Callendar House, Falkirk
- Guy Stewart Callendar (1898 – 1964), English steam engineer and inventor and son of Hugh Longbourne Callendar
  - Callendar effect
- Hugh Longbourne Callendar (1863 – 1930), British physicist and father of Guy Stewart Callendar

== See also ==
- Calendar - (chronological system or book)
- Calender - (roller system)
- Callander - (Town in Scotland)
- Callender (disambiguation)
- Colander (kitchen utensil)
- Qalandar (disambiguation)
