= John Callender (psychiatrist) =

Scottish psychiatrist and philosopher

- Born: 1954 (age 71–72)
- Education: University of Glasgow
- Occupations: psychiatrist and philosopher
- Known for: research primarily focused on the application of Kantian ethics and aesthetics to psychiatric disorders and therapeutic treatment
- Notable work: Free will and responsibility: A guide for practitioners
- Spouse: married
- Children: 3

John Callender (born 1954) is a Scottish psychiatrist and philosopher.

Callender graduated from the University of Glasgow in 1977. He is a consultant psychiatrist at the Royal Cornhill Hospital in Aberdeen, the associate director of Grampian Medical Health Services and an Honorary Senior Lecturer at the University of Aberdeen. He was one of the four entry-points for transgender healthcare in Scotland, serving the Grampian, Orkney and Shetland areas, but is now retired.

His philosophical research is primarily focused on the application of Kantian ethics and aesthetics to psychiatric disorders and therapeutic treatment. He has published articles in the Journal of Medical Ethics, Clinical Psychology and Psychotherapy and Philosophy, Psychiatry, & Psychology.

He lives in Aberdeen with his wife and three children.

== Papers ==
- Ethics and aims in psychotherapy: a contribution from Kant
- The Role of Aesthetic Judgments in Psychotherapy

== Books ==
- Callender, John (29 April 2010). Free will and responsibility: A guide for practitioners. OUP Oxford. ISBN 978-0199545551.
