= Gozuiyeh =

Gozuiyeh or Gazuiyeh or Gazooeyeh or Gazuyeh (Persian: گزوييه) may refer to:

- Gazuiyeh, Bardsir
- Gazuiyeh, Shahr-e Babak
- Gazuiyeh, Zarand
- Gazuiyeh Cheshmeh Khandali
- Gozuiyeh-ye Olya
- Gozuiyeh-ye Sofla
