= Narrab =

Narrab or Narab (Persian: نراب) may refer to:

- Nar Ab, East Azerbaijan Province
- Narrab, Golestan
- Narab, Jiroft, Kerman Province
- Narrab, Rabor, Kerman Province
- Narab, Sirjan, Kerman Province
