= Bagh Bid =

Bagh Bid or Baghbid or Bagh-i-Bid (Persian: باغ بيد), also known as Bab Bid and Babid, may refer to:

- Bagh Bid, Kerman
- Bagh Bid-e Olya, Kerman Province
- Bagh Bid-e Sofla, Kerman Province
- Bagh Bid, Yazd
