= Gerdustan =

Gerdustan گردوستان
- Village
- Location within Iran
- Coordinates: 29°23′31″N 57°07′37″E
- Country: Iran
- Province: Kerman
- County: Rabor
- Bakhsh: Hanza
- Rural District: Hanza

Population (2006)
  - Total: 57
- Time zone: UTC+3:30 (IRST)
  - Summer (DST): UTC+4:30 (IRDT)

Gerdustan (Persian: گردوستان, also Romanized as Gerdūstān) is a village in Hanza Rural District, Hanza District, Rabor County, Kerman Province, Iran. At the 2006 census, its population was 57, in 10 families.
