= Geluchar =

Geluchar گلوچار
- Village
- Location within Iran
- Coordinates: 29°17′40″N 57°06′46″E
- Country: Iran
- Province: Kerman
- County: Rabor
- Bakhsh: Hanza
- Rural District: Hanza

Population (2006)
  - Total: 39
- Time zone: UTC+3:30 (IRST)
  - Summer (DST): UTC+4:30 (IRDT)

Geluchar (Persian: گلوچار, also Romanized as Gelūchār; also known as Galū Jār) is a village in Hanza Rural District, Hanza District, Rabor County, Kerman Province, Iran. At the 2006 census, its population was 39, in 11 families.
