= Gur Saruiyeh =

Gur Saruiyeh گورساروئيه
- Village
- Location within Iran
- Coordinates: 29°15′45″N 56°48′40″E
- Country: Iran
- Province: Kerman
- County: Rabor
- Bakhsh: Central
- Rural District: Rabor

Population (2006)
  - Total: 49
- Time zone: UTC+3:30 (IRST)
  - Summer (DST): UTC+4:30 (IRDT)

Gur Saruiyeh (Persian: گورساروئيه, also Romanized as Gūr Sārū’īyeh; also known as Gūr-e Sārūn and Gūr Sārūn) is a village in Rabor Rural District, in the Central District of Rabor County, Kerman Province, Iran. At the 2006 census, its population was 49, in 14 families.
