= Kaluiyeh =

Kaluiyeh كلوييه
- Village
- Location within Iran
- Coordinates: 29°20′02″N 57°09′35″E
- Country: Iran
- Province: Kerman
- County: Rabor
- Bakhsh: Hanza
- Rural District: Hanza

Population (2006)
  - Total: 38
- Time zone: UTC+3:30 (IRST)
  - Summer (DST): UTC+4:30 (IRDT)

Kaluiyeh (Persian: كلوييه, also Romanized as Kalū’īyeh) is a village in Hanza Rural District, Hanza District, Rabor County, Kerman Province, Iran. At the 2006 census, its population was 38, in 10 families.
