= Siyah Banuiyeh =

Village in Kerman province, Iran

Siyah Banuiyeh Persian: سيه بنوئيه
- Village
- Location within Iran
- Coordinates: 29°20′38″N 56°55′26″E
- Country: Iran
- Province: Kerman
- County: Rabor
- District: Central
- Rural District: Siyahbanuiyeh

Population (2016)
  - Total: 2,060
- Time zone: UTC+3:30 (IRST)

Siyah Banuiyeh (Persian: سيه بنوييه) (Note: Also romanized as Sīyah Banū’īyeh, Sīāhbenū’īyeh, and Sīāhbenūyeh; also known as Banū’īyeh and Sagono (ساگنو)) is a village in, and the capital of, Siyahbanuiyeh Rural District of the Central District of Rabor County, Kerman province, Iran.

== Demographics ==
=== Population ===
At the time of the 2006 National Census, the village's population was 2,285 in 499 households, when it was in the former Rabor District of Baft County. The following census in 2011 counted 2,144 people in 618 households, by which time the district had been separated from the county in the establishment of Rabor County. The rural district was transferred to the new Central District. The 2016 census measured the population of the village as 2,060 people in 655 households. It was the most populous village in its rural district.
