= Deh-e Naiyeh =

Deh-e Naiyeh ده ناييه
- Village
- Country: Iran
- Province: Kerman
- County: Rabor
- Bakhsh: Central
- Rural District: Siyah Banuiyeh

Population (2006)
  - Total: 27
- Time zone: UTC+3:30 (IRST)
  - Summer (DST): UTC+4:30 (IRDT)

Deh-e Naiyeh (Persian: ده ناييه, also Romanized as Deh-e Nāīyeh) is a village in Siyah Banuiyeh Rural District, in the Central District of Rabor County, Kerman Province, Iran. At the 2006 census, its population was 27, in 5 families.
