= Tilinuiyeh =

Tilinuiyeh تيلي نو ئيه
- Village
- Location within Iran
- Coordinates: 29°03′54″N 57°03′22″E
- Country: Iran
- Province: Kerman
- County: Rabor
- Bakhsh: Hanza
- Rural District: Javaran

Population (2006)
  - Total: 46
- Time zone: UTC+3:30 (IRST)
  - Summer (DST): UTC+4:30 (IRDT)

Tilinuiyeh (Persian: تيلي نو ئيه, also Romanized as Tīlīnū’īyeh) is a village in Javaran Rural District, Hanza District, Rabor County, Kerman Province, Iran. At the 2006 census, its population was 46, in 8 families.
