= Barf Anbar, Kerman =

Barf Anbar برف انبار
- Village
- Location within Iran
- Coordinates: 29°20′48″N 57°06′13″E
- Country: Iran
- Province: Kerman
- County: Rabor
- Bakhsh: Hanza
- Rural District: Hanza

Population (2006)
  - Total: 31
- Time zone: UTC+3:30 (IRST)
  - Summer (DST): UTC+4:30 (IRDT)

Barf Anbar (Persian: برف انبار, also Romanized as Barf Anbār; also known as Barf Andāz) is a village in Hanza Rural District, Hanza District, Rabor County, Kerman Province, Iran. At the 2006 census, its population was 31, in 9 families.
