= Ab Kuch =

Ab Kuch ابكوچ
- Village
- Country: Iran
- Province: Kerman
- County: Rabor
- Bakhsh: Hanza
- Rural District: Hanza

Population (2006)
  - Total: 244
- Time zone: UTC+3:30 (IRST)
  - Summer (DST): UTC+4:30 (IRDT)

Ab Kuch (Persian: ابكوچ, also Romanized as Āb Kūch) is a village in Hanza Rural District, Hanza District, Rabor County, Kerman Province, Iran. At the 2006 census, its population was 244, in 39 families.
