= Meshk Abdan =

Meshk Abdan مشك ابدان
- Village
- Location within Iran
- Coordinates: 29°10′07″N 57°00′25″E
- Country: Iran
- Province: Kerman
- County: Rabor
- Bakhsh: Hanza
- Rural District: Javaran

Population (2006)
  - Total: 42
- Time zone: UTC+3:30 (IRST)
  - Summer (DST): UTC+4:30 (IRDT)

Meshk Abdan (Persian: مشك ابدان, also Romanized as Meshk Ābdān) is a village in Javaran Rural District, Hanza District, Rabor County, Kerman Province, Iran. At the 2006 census, its population was 42, in 12 families.
