= Eshkoftuiyeh =

Eshkoftuiyeh اسكفتوئيه
- Village
- Location within Iran
- Coordinates: 29°13′37″N 57°03′13″E
- Country: Iran
- Province: Kerman
- County: Rabor
- Bakhsh: Hanza
- Rural District: Hanza

Population (2006)
  - Total: 27
- Time zone: UTC+3:30 (IRST)
  - Summer (DST): UTC+4:30 (IRDT)

Eshkoftuiyeh (Persian: اسكفتوئيه, also Romanized as Eshkoftū’īyeh) is a village in Hanza Rural District, Hanza District, Rabor County, Kerman Province, Iran. At the 2006 census, its population was 27, in 6 families.
