= Bi Zanuiyeh =

Bi Zanuiyeh بيزنوئيه
- Village
- Location within Iran
- Coordinates: 29°20′27″N 56°52′30″E
- Country: Iran
- Province: Kerman
- County: Rabor
- Bakhsh: Central
- Rural District: Siyah Banuiyeh

Population (2006)
  - Total: 99
- Time zone: UTC+3:30 (IRST)
  - Summer (DST): UTC+4:30 (IRDT)

Bi Zanuiyeh (Persian: بيزنوئيه, also Romanized as Bī Zanū’īyeh; also known as Bīsū’īyeh) is a village in Siyah Banuiyeh Rural District, in the Central District of Rabor County, Kerman Province, Iran. At the 2006 census, its population was 99, in 31 families.
