= Padeh Boland-e Olya =

Padeh Boland-e Olya پده بلندعليا
- Village
- Location within Iran
- Coordinates: 29°03′17″N 57°00′33″E
- Country: Iran
- Province: Kerman
- County: Rabor
- Bakhsh: Hanza
- Rural District: Javaran

Population (2006)
  - Total: 54
- Time zone: UTC+3:30 (IRST)
  - Summer (DST): UTC+4:30 (IRDT)

Padeh Boland-e Olya (Persian: پده بلندعليا, also Romanized as Padeh Boland-e ‘Olyā and Pedehboland-e ‘Olyā) is a village in Javaran Rural District, Hanza District, Rabor County, Kerman Province, Iran. At the 2006 census, its population was 54 in 14 families.
