= Pay-e Zebr =

Pay-e Zebr پاي زبر
- Village
- Location within Iran
- Coordinates: 29°17′01″N 57°05′54″E
- Country: Iran
- Province: Kerman
- County: Rabor
- Bakhsh: Hanza
- Rural District: Hanza

Population (2006)
  - Total: 32
- Time zone: UTC+3:30 (IRST)
  - Summer (DST): UTC+4:30 (IRDT)

Pay-e Zebr (Persian: پاي زبر, also Romanized as Pāy-e Zebr; also known as Pāy Zīr) is a village in Hanza Rural District, Hanza District, Rabor County, Kerman Province, Iran. At the 2006 census, its population was 32, in 9 families.
