= Koldan =

Koldan (Persian: كلدان) may refer to:

- Koldan, Baft, Kerman Province
- Koldan, Jiroft, Kerman Province
- Koldan, Rabor, Kerman Province
- Koldan, Sistan and Baluchestan
