= Goli Nuiyeh =

Goli Nuiyeh گلينوييه
- Village
- Location within Iran
- Coordinates: 29°19′48″N 56°56′43″E
- Country: Iran
- Province: Kerman
- County: Rabor
- Bakhsh: Central
- Rural District: Siyah Banuiyeh

Population (2006)
  - Total: 265
- Time zone: UTC+3:30 (IRST)
  - Summer (DST): UTC+4:30 (IRDT)

Goli Nuiyeh (Persian: گلينوييه, also Romanized as Golī Nū’īyeh and Golī Now’īyeh; also known as Golūnū’īyeh) is a village in Siyah Banuiyeh Rural District, in the Central District of Rabor County, Kerman Province, Iran. At the 2006 census, its population was 265, in 63 families.
