= Eshkanuiyeh-ye Olya =

Eshkanuiyeh-ye Olya اشكنوئيه عليا
- Village
- Location within Iran
- Coordinates: 29°20′08″N 57°07′23″E
- Country: Iran
- Province: Kerman
- County: Rabor
- Bakhsh: Hanza
- Rural District: Hanza

Population (2006)
  - Total: 78
- Time zone: UTC+3:30 (IRST)
  - Summer (DST): UTC+4:30 (IRDT)

Eshkanuiyeh-ye Olya (Persian: اشكنوئيه عليا, also Romanized as Eshkanū’īyeh-ye ‘Olyā; also known as Eshkanū’īyeh and Ishkanu) is a village in Hanza Rural District, Hanza District, Rabor County, Kerman Province, Iran. At the 2006 census, its population was 78, in 13 families.
