= Gonjan =

Gonjan گنجان
- Village
- Location within Iran
- Coordinates: 29°20′36″N 56°56′25″E
- Country: Iran
- Province: Kerman
- County: Rabor
- Bakhsh: Central
- Rural District: Siyah Banuiyeh

Population (2006)
  - Total: 1,428
- Time zone: UTC+3:30 (IRST)
  - Summer (DST): UTC+4:30 (IRDT)

Gonjan (Persian: گنجان, also Romanized as Gonjān and Ganjān) is a village in Siyah Banuiyeh Rural District, in the Central District of Rabor County, Kerman Province, Iran. At the 2006 census, its population was 1,428, in 360 families.
