= Remu Darreh-ye Olya =

Remu Darreh-ye Olya رمودره عليا
- Village
- Location within Iran
- Coordinates: 29°19′11″N 57°09′30″E
- Country: Iran
- Province: Kerman
- County: Rabor
- Bakhsh: Hanza
- Rural District: Hanza

Population (2006)
  - Total: 76
- Time zone: UTC+3:30 (IRST)
  - Summer (DST): UTC+4:30 (IRDT)

Remu Darreh-ye Olya (Persian: رمودره عليا, also Romanized as Remū Darreh-ye ‘Olyā; also known as Remū Darreh) is a village in Hanza Rural District, Hanza District, Rabor County, Kerman Province, Iran. In the 2006 census, its population was listed as 76 individuals, from 20 different families.
