= Armalok =

Armalok ارملک
- Village
- Location within Iran
- Coordinates: 29°17′00″N 56°50′31″E
- Country: Iran
- Province: Kerman
- County: Rabor
- Bakhsh: Central
- Rural District: Rabor

Population (2006)
  - Total: 65
- Time zone: UTC+3:30 (IRST)
  - Summer (DST): UTC+4:30 (IRDT)

Armalok (Persian: ارملک, also Romanized as Ārmalok) is a village in Rabor Rural District, in the Central District of Rabor County, Kerman Province, Iran. At the 2006 census, its population was 65, in 14 families.
