= Sar Ghashk =

Sar Ghashk سرغشك
- Village
- Location within Iran
- Coordinates: 29°15′14″N 56°58′52″E
- Country: Iran
- Province: Kerman
- County: Rabor
- Bakhsh: Hanza
- Rural District: Javaran

Population (2006)
  - Total: 57
- Time zone: UTC+3:30 (IRST)
  - Summer (DST): UTC+4:30 (IRDT)

Sar Ghashk (Persian: سرغشك; also known as Sar-e Ghashak) is a village in Javaran Rural District, Hanza District, Rabor County, Kerman Province, Iran. At the 2006 census, its population was 57, in 16 families.
