= Seghin =

Seghin or Saghin (Persian: صغين or سغين or ساغين) may refer to:

- Seghin, Baft, Kerman Province (سغين - Seghīn)
- Saghin, Kerman, Kerman Province (سغين - Saghīn)
- Seghin, Rabor, Kerman Province (صغين - Şeghīn)
