= Bid Shirin =

Bid Shirin or Bid-e Shirin (Persian: بيدشيرين) may refer to:

- Bid-e Shirin, Jiroft
- Bid-e Shirin, Kerman
- Bid-e Shirin-e Do
