= Karzuiyeh =

Karzuiyeh كارزوئيه
- Village
- Country: Iran
- Province: Kerman
- County: Rabor
- Bakhsh: Central
- Rural District: Rabor

Population (2006)
  - Total: 58
- Time zone: UTC+3:30 (IRST)
  - Summer (DST): UTC+4:30 (IRDT)

Karzuiyeh (Persian: كارزوئيه, also Romanized as Kārzū’īyeh) is a village in Rabor Rural District, in the Central District of Rabor County, Kerman Province, Iran. At the 2006 census, its population was 58, in 13 families.
