= Kal Meshk =

Kal Meshk کل مشک
- Village
- Location within Iran
- Coordinates: 29°16′34″N 56°46′59″E
- Country: Iran
- Province: Kerman
- County: Rabor
- Bakhsh: Central
- Rural District: Rabor

Population (2006)
  - Total: 98
- Time zone: UTC+3:30 (IRST)
  - Summer (DST): UTC+4:30 (IRDT)

Kal Meshk (Persian: کل مشک, also Romanized as Kal Mashk; also known as Gol Mashk and Kalmūsht) is a village in Rabor Rural District, in the Central District of Rabor County, Kerman Province, Iran. At the 2006 census, its population was 98, in 28 families.
