= Bagh-e Pirevali =

Bagh-e Pirevali باغ پيرولي
- Village
- Location within Iran
- Coordinates: 29°16′33″N 56°49′19″E
- Country: Iran
- Province: Kerman
- County: Rabor
- Bakhsh: Central
- Rural District: Rabor

Population (2006)
  - Total: 124
- Time zone: UTC+3:30 (IRST)
  - Summer (DST): UTC+4:30 (IRDT)

Bagh-e Pirevali (Persian: باغ پيرولي, also Romanized as Bāgh-e Pīrevalī) is a village in Rabor Rural District, in the Central District of Rabor County, Kerman Province, Iran. At the 2006 census, its population was 124, in 32 families.
