= Seyyed Morteza =

Seyyed Morteza سيدمرتضي
- Village
- Location within Iran
- Coordinates: 29°13′56″N 57°03′27″E
- Country: Iran
- Province: Kerman
- County: Rabor
- Bakhsh: Hanza
- Rural District: Hanza

Population (2006)
  - Total: 73
- Time zone: UTC+3:30 (IRST)
  - Summer (DST): UTC+4:30 (IRDT)

Seyyed Morteza (Persian: سيدمرتضي, also Romanized as Seyyed Morteẕá and Seyyed Mortazā; also known as Deh-e Seyyed Morteẕá, Deh-e Seyyed Mortezá, and Saiyid Murtaza) is a village in Hanza Rural District, Hanza District, Rabor County, Kerman Province, Iran. At the 2006 census, its population was 73, in 17 families.
