= Sheykh Jalali =

Sheykh Jalali شيخ جلالي
- Village
- Location within Iran
- Coordinates: 29°16′14″N 56°56′51″E
- Country: Iran
- Province: Kerman
- County: Rabor
- Bakhsh: Central
- Rural District: Rabor

Population (2006)
  - Total: 67
- Time zone: UTC+3:30 (IRST)
  - Summer (DST): UTC+4:30 (IRDT)

Sheykh Jalali (Persian: شيخ جلالي, also Romanized as Sheykh Jalalī) is a village in Rabor Rural District, in the Central District of Rabor County, Kerman Province, Iran. At the 2006 census, its population was 67, in 17 families.
