= Bab Galuiyeh =

Bab Galuiyeh بابگلوييه
- Village
- Location within Iran
- Coordinates: 29°19′45″N 56°59′37″E
- Country: Iran
- Province: Kerman
- County: Rabor
- Bakhsh: Central
- Rural District: Siyah Banuiyeh

Population (2006)
  - Total: 88
- Time zone: UTC+3:30 (IRST)
  - Summer (DST): UTC+4:30 (IRDT)

Bab Galuiyeh (Persian: بابگلوييه, also Romanized as Bāb Galū’īyeh) is a village in Siyah Banuiyeh Rural District, in the Central District of Rabor County, Kerman Province, Iran. At the 2006 census, its population was 88, in 20 families.
