= Kahnuj, Rabor =

Village in Kerman province, Iran

Kahnuj Persian: كهنوج
- Village
- Location within Iran
- Coordinates: 29°16′49″N 56°59′31″E
- Country: Iran
- Province: Kerman
- County: Rabor
- District: Hanza
- Rural District: Javaran

Population (2016)
  - Total: 196
- Time zone: UTC+3:30 (IRST)

Kahnuj (Persian: كهنوج) (Note: Also romanized as Kahnooj and Kahnūj) is a village in, and the capital of, Javaran Rural District of Hanza District, Rabor County, Kerman province, Iran.

== Demographics ==
=== Population ===
At the time of the 2006 National Census, the village's population was 245 in 55 households, when it was in the former Rabor District of Baft County. The following census in 2011 counted 208 people in 70 households, by which time the district had been separated from the county in the establishment of Rabor County. The rural district was transferred to the new Hanza District. The 2016 census measured the population of the village as 196 people in 64 households.
