= Khaneh Reghan =

Khaneh Reghan خانه رغان
- Village
- Location within Iran
- Coordinates: 29°17′44″N 57°08′23″E
- Country: Iran
- Province: Kerman
- County: Rabor
- Bakhsh: Hanza
- Rural District: Hanza

Population (2006)
  - Total: 252
- Time zone: UTC+3:30 (IRST)
  - Summer (DST): UTC+4:30 (IRDT)

Khaneh Reghan (Persian: خانه رغان, also Romanized as Khāneh Reghān; also known as Khāneh Rūghān) is a village in Hanza Rural District, Hanza District, Rabor County, Kerman Province, Iran. At the 2006 census, its population was 252, in 57 families.
