= Sirbenuiyeh =

Sirbenuiyeh سيربنوئيه
- Village
- Country: Iran
- Province: Kerman
- County: Rabor
- Bakhsh: Hanza
- Rural District: Javaran

Population (2006)
  - Total: 163
- Time zone: UTC+3:30 (IRST)
  - Summer (DST): UTC+4:30 (IRDT)

Sirbenuiyeh (Persian: سيربنوئيه, also Romanized as Sīrbenū’īyeh) is a village in Javaran Rural District, Hanza District, Rabor County, Kerman Province, Iran. At the 2006 census, its population was 163, in 40 families.
