= Targuiyeh =

Targuiyeh ترگوئيه
- Village
- Country: Iran
- Province: Kerman
- County: Rabor
- Bakhsh: Hanza
- Rural District: Hanza

Population (2006)
  - Total: 31
- Time zone: UTC+3:30 (IRST)
  - Summer (DST): UTC+4:30 (IRDT)

Targuiyeh (Persian: ترگوئيه, also Romanized as Targū’īyeh) is a village in Hanza Rural District, Hanza District, Rabor County, Kerman Province, Iran. At the 2006 census, its population was 31, in 12 families.
