= Padumabad =

Padumabad پدوم اباد
- Village
- Location within Iran
- Coordinates: 28°59′47″N 57°04′17″E
- Country: Iran
- Province: Kerman
- County: Rabor
- Bakhsh: Hanza
- Rural District: Javaran

Population (2006)
  - Total: 97
- Time zone: UTC+3:30 (IRST)
  - Summer (DST): UTC+4:30 (IRDT)

Padumabad (Persian: پدوم اباد, also Romanized as Padūmābād; also known as Deh Paduma, Fadamābād, Padāmābād, Padomābād, and Qadamābād) is a village in Javaran Rural District, Hanza District, Rabor County, Kerman Province, Iran. At the 2006 census, its population was 97, in 22 families.
