= Poshteh Zang =

Poshteh Zang پشته زنگ
- Village
- Location within Iran
- Coordinates: 29°19′40″N 57°09′15″E
- Country: Iran
- Province: Kerman
- County: Rabor
- Bakhsh: Hanza
- Rural District: Hanza

Population (2006)
  - Total: 108
- Time zone: UTC+3:30 (IRST)
  - Summer (DST): UTC+4:30 (IRDT)

Poshteh Zang (Persian: پشته زنگ, also Romanized as Poshteh Zong; also known as Poshteh Zānak, Poshteh Zerang, and Pusht-i-Zunk) is a village in Hanza Rural District, Hanza District, Rabor County, Kerman Province, Iran. At the 2006 census, its population was 108, in 23 families.

By the 2016 National Census, the population had increased to 126 residents in 48 households.
