= Kavusabad =

Kavusabad كاووس اباد
- Village
- Location within Iran
- Coordinates: 29°12′36″N 57°02′24″E
- Country: Iran
- Province: Kerman
- County: Rabor
- Bakhsh: Hanza
- Rural District: Hanza

Population (2006)
  - Total: 16
- Time zone: UTC+3:30 (IRST)
  - Summer (DST): UTC+4:30 (IRDT)

Kavusabad (Persian: كاووس اباد, also Romanized as Kāvūsābād) is a village in Hanza Rural District, Hanza District, Rabor County, Kerman Province, Iran. At the 2006 census, its population was 16, in 4 families.
