= Juybadam =

Juybadam جوي بادام
- Village
- Location within Iran
- Coordinates: 29°08′01″N 56°58′43″E
- Country: Iran
- Province: Kerman
- County: Rabor
- Bakhsh: Hanza
- Rural District: Javaran

Population (2006)
  - Total: 63
- Time zone: UTC+3:30 (IRST)
  - Summer (DST): UTC+4:30 (IRDT)

Juybadam (Persian: جوي بادام, also Romanized as Jūybādām; also known as Jow Bādām, Jow-ye Bādām, Jūbādām, and Jūb Bādām) is a village in Javaran Rural District, Hanza District, Rabor County, Kerman Province, Iran. At the 2006 census, its population was 63, in 18 families.
