= Nanook (disambiguation) =

Nanook, in Inuit mythology, is the master of bears.

Nanook, Nanuk, or Nanuq may also refer to:

== Art, entertainment, and media ==
- Nanook (band), Greenlandic pop rock band
- Nanook (TV series), whose title character is named Nanook
- Nanook of the North (1922), a film by Robert Flaherty, often considered the first formal feature-length documentary
- Nanook, Corey Haim's dog in the film The Lost Boys (1987)
- Nanoq Media, a company in Greenland
- Nanook, Aeon of Destruction in the game Honkai: Star Rail

== Places ==
- Tanfield Valley or Nanook, a Viking settlement and archaeological site on Baffin Island
- Nanuk, Iran, a village in Kerman Province, Iran
- Nanook River, Victoria Island, Canada
- Nanook Dome, British Columbia, Canada
- Nanook or Nanuk, alternate names of Menukin, a village in Kerman Province, Iran
- Nanuk-e Bala, alternate name of Naniz-e Olya, a village in Kerman Province, Iran
- Nanoq, a museum in Jakobstad, Finland

== Military ==
- Operation Nanook (1946), an Arctic expedition undertaken by the US Navy in 1946
- Operation Nanook, annual Arctic exercise by Canada's Maritime Command and Canada's Coast Guard
- Nanuk Remotely Controlled Weapon Station
- Project Nanook, US reconnaissance project

== Mascot ==
- Alaska Nanooks, the University of Alaska Fairbanks sports teams
- Edmonton Eskimos, of the Canadian Football League, mascot from 1997 to 2021

== Other uses ==
- Nanok East Greenland Fishing Company, a Danish company in Greenland
- Nanuk (ship), a 1892 schooner used in several Metro-Goldwyn-Mayer films in the 1930s
- nanuk, Czech and Slovak word for ice cream bar

== See also ==
- "Nanook Rubs It", a song by Frank Zappa on the album Apostrophe (1974)
