= Galu Gazer =

Galu Gazer گلوگازر
- Village
- Location within Iran
- Coordinates: 29°16′23″N 57°08′42″E
- Country: Iran
- Province: Kerman
- County: Rabor
- Bakhsh: Hanza
- Rural District: Hanza

Population (2006)
  - Total: 168
- Time zone: UTC+3:30 (IRST)
  - Summer (DST): UTC+4:30 (IRDT)

Galu Gazer (Persian: گلوگازر, also Romanized as Galū Gāzer) is a village in Hanza Rural District, Hanza District, Rabor County, Kerman Province, Iran. At the 2006 census, its population was 168, in 35 families.
