= Morrin, Iran =

Morrin مرين
- Village
- Location within Iran
- Coordinates: 29°14′25″N 57°07′42″E
- Country: Iran
- Province: Kerman
- County: Rabor
- Bakhsh: Hanza
- Rural District: Hanza

Population (2006)
  - Total: 29
- Time zone: UTC+3:30 (IRST)
  - Summer (DST): UTC+4:30 (IRDT)

Morrin (Persian: مرين, also Romanized as Morrīn; also known as Mūrīn and Mūyen) is a village in Hanza Rural District, Hanza District, Rabor County, Kerman Province, Iran. At the 2006 census, its population was 29, in 9 families.
