= Gowd-e Gerd =

Gowd-e Gerd گودگرد
- Village
- Location within Iran
- Coordinates: 29°12′55″N 57°06′56″E
- Country: Iran
- Province: Kerman
- County: Rabor
- Bakhsh: Hanza
- Rural District: Hanza

Population (2006)
  - Total: 33
- Time zone: UTC+3:30 (IRST)
  - Summer (DST): UTC+4:30 (IRDT)

Gowd-e Gerd (Persian: گودگرد; also known as Gowd-e Gerdū’īyeh) is a village in Hanza Rural District, Hanza District, Rabor County, Kerman Province, Iran. At the 2006 census, its population was 33, in 9 families.
