= Menukin =

Menukin منوكين
- Village
- Location within Iran
- Coordinates: 29°19′13″N 56°51′43″E
- Country: Iran
- Province: Kerman
- County: Rabor
- Bakhsh: Central
- Rural District: Rabor

Population (2006)
  - Total: 34
- Time zone: UTC+3:30 (IRST)
  - Summer (DST): UTC+4:30 (IRDT)

Menukin (Persian: منوكين, also Romanized as Menūkīn; also known as Manūkī, Nanook, Nānu, and Nanūk) is a village in Rabor Rural District, in the Central District of Rabor County, Kerman Province, Iran. At the 2006 census, its population was 34, in 10 families.
