= Seghin, Rabor =

Seghin صغين
- Village
- Location within Iran
- Coordinates: 29°09′19″N 57°03′58″E
- Country: Iran
- Province: Kerman
- County: Rabor
- Bakhsh: Hanza
- Rural District: Hanza

Population (2006)
  - Total: 32
- Time zone: UTC+3:30 (IRST)
  - Summer (DST): UTC+4:30 (IRDT)

Seghin (Persian: صغين, also Romanized as Şeghīn, Saghīn, Seghīn, Soghīn, and Sagheyn; also known as Sagin, Sakhang, Saqīnak, Saqīnk, Seh Ghenk, and Shaghīn) is a village in Hanza Rural District, Hanza District, Rabor County, Kerman Province, Iran. At the 2006 census, its population was 32, in 12 families.
