= Seh Darreh =

Seh Darreh (Persian: سه دره) may refer to:

- Seh Darreh, Arsanjan, Fars Province
- Seh Darreh, Jahrom, Fars Province
- Seh Darreh, Kerman
- Seh Darreh, Zanjan
