= Sanguiyeh, Rabor =

Sanguiyeh سنگوييه
- Village
- Location within Iran
- Coordinates: 29°11′34″N 57°00′09″E
- Country: Iran
- Province: Kerman
- County: Rabor
- Bakhsh: Hanza
- Rural District: Javaran

Population (2006)
  - Total: 21
- Time zone: UTC+3:30 (IRST)
  - Summer (DST): UTC+4:30 (IRDT)

Sanguiyeh (Persian: سنگوييه, also Romanized as Sangū’īyeh) is a village in Javaran Rural District, Hanza District, Rabor County, Kerman Province, Iran. At the 2006 census, its population was 21, in 4 families.
