= Sarhanger =

Sarhanger or Sarhangar (Persian: سرهنگر) may refer to:

- Sarhangar, Jiroft
- Sarhanger, Rabor
