= Gazinuiyeh =

Gazinuiyeh گزنوييه
- Village
- Location within Iran
- Coordinates: 29°16′45″N 56°59′59″E
- Country: Iran
- Province: Kerman
- County: Rabor
- Bakhsh: Central
- Rural District: Siyah Banuiyeh

Population (2006)
  - Total: 23
- Time zone: UTC+3:30 (IRST)
  - Summer (DST): UTC+4:30 (IRDT)

Gazinuiyeh (Persian: گزنوييه, also Romanized as Gazīnū’īyeh; also known as Garīnow, Garīnū’īyeh, and Gerīnū) is a village in Siyah Banuiyeh Rural District, in the Central District of Rabor County, Kerman Province, Iran. At the 2006 census, its population was 23, in 6 families.
