= Bagh Bid-e Sofla =

Bagh Bid-e Sofla باغ بيدسفلي
- Village
- Location within Iran
- Coordinates: 29°09′19″N 56°57′35″E
- Country: Iran
- Province: Kerman
- County: Rabor
- Bakhsh: Hanza
- Rural District: Javaran

Population (2006)
  - Total: 61
- Time zone: UTC+3:30 (IRST)
  - Summer (DST): UTC+4:30 (IRDT)

Bagh Bid-e Sofla (Persian: باغ بيدسفلي, also Romanized as Bāgh Bīd-e Soflá; also known as Bāb Bīd-e Soflá (Persian: باب بيدسفلي), Bāb Bīd-e Pā’īn, and Bābīd-e Soflá) is a village in Javaran Rural District, Hanza District, Rabor County, Kerman Province, Iran. At the 2006 census, its population was 61, in 14 families.
