= Deh Divan, Rabor =

Deh Divan ده ديوان
- Village
- Location within Iran
- Coordinates: 29°20′33″N 56°50′51″E
- Country: Iran
- Province: Kerman
- County: Rabor
- Bakhsh: Central
- Rural District: Rabor

Population (2006)
  - Total: 182
- Time zone: UTC+3:30 (IRST)
  - Summer (DST): UTC+4:30 (IRDT)

Deh Divan (Persian: ده ديوان, also Romanized as Deh Dīvān and Deh-e Dīvān) is a village in Rabor Rural District, in the Central District of Rabor County, Kerman Province, Iran. At the 2006 census, its population was 182, in 38 families.
