= Esker, Iran =

Village in Kerman province, Iran

Esker Persian: اسكر
- Village
- Location within Iran
- Coordinates: 29°18′43″N 56°50′16″E
- Country: Iran
- Province: Kerman
- County: Rabor
- District: Central
- Rural District: Rabor

Population (2016)
  - Total: 1,734
- Time zone: UTC+3:30 (IRST)

Esker (Persian: اسكر) (Note: Also romanized as ‘Askar; also known as ‘Asgar) is a village in, and the capital of, Rabor Rural District of the Central District of Rabor County, Kerman province, Iran.

== Demographics ==
=== Population ===
At the time of the 2006 National Census, the village's population was 2,080 in 494 households, when it was in the former Rabor District of Baft County. The following census in 2011 counted 1,566 people in 508 households, by which time the district had been separated from the county in the establishment of Rabor County. The 2016 census measured the population of the village as 1,734 people in 592 households. It was the most populous village in its rural district.
