= Gozuiyeh-ye Olya =

Gozuiyeh-ye Olya گزوييه عليا
- Village
- Location within Iran
- Coordinates: 29°09′05″N 56°59′22″E
- Country: Iran
- Province: Kerman
- County: Rabor
- Bakhsh: Hanza
- Rural District: Javaran

Population (2006)
  - Total: 120
- Time zone: UTC+3:30 (IRST)
  - Summer (DST): UTC+4:30 (IRDT)

Gozuiyeh-ye Olya (Persian: گزوييه عليا, also Romanized as Gozū’īyeh-ye ‘Olyā; also known as Gazū’īyeh and Gozū’īyeh) is a village in Javaran Rural District, Hanza District, Rabor County, Kerman Province, Iran. At the 2006 census, its population was 120, in 20 families.
