= Zard Aluiyeh =

Zard Aluiyeh زردالوئيه
- Village
- Location within Iran
- Coordinates: 29°16′46″N 57°02′16″E
- Country: Iran
- Province: Kerman
- County: Rabor
- Bakhsh: Hanza
- Rural District: Javaran

Population (2006)
  - Total: 31
- Time zone: UTC+3:30 (IRST)
  - Summer (DST): UTC+4:30 (IRDT)

Zard Aluiyeh (Persian: زردالوئيه, also Romanized as Zard Ālū’īyeh; also known as Zardālū and Zardālūyeh) is a village in Javaran Rural District, Hanza District, Rabor County, Kerman Province, Iran. At the 2006 census, its population was 31, in 8 families.
