= Deh Divan =

Deh Divan or Deh-e Divan (Persian: ده ديوان) may refer to:

- Deh Divan, Jiroft
- Deh Divan, Rabor
