= Kangari =

Kangari (Persian: كنگري) may refer to:

- Kangari, Jiroft
- Kangari, Rabor
