= Kotk, Kerman =

Kotk كتك
- Village
- Location within Iran
- Coordinates: 29°11′14″N 56°59′42″E
- Country: Iran
- Province: Kerman
- County: Rabor
- Bakhsh: Hanza
- Rural District: Javaran

Population (2006)
  - Total: 86
- Time zone: UTC+3:30 (IRST)
  - Summer (DST): UTC+4:30 (IRDT)

Kotk (Persian: كتك, also Romanized as Godak) is a village in Javaran Rural District, Hanza District, Rabor County, Kerman Province, Iran. At the 2006 census, its population was 86, in 22 families.
