= Bagh Bid-e Olya =

Bagh Bid-e Olya باغ بيدعليا
- Village
- Location within Iran
- Coordinates: 29°10′22″N 56°57′06″E
- Country: Iran
- Province: Kerman
- County: Rabor
- Bakhsh: Hanza
- Rural District: Javaran

Population (2006)
  - Total: 146
- Time zone: UTC+3:30 (IRST)
  - Summer (DST): UTC+4:30 (IRDT)

Bagh Bid-e Olya (Persian: باغ بيدعليا, also Romanized as Bāgh Bīd-e ‘Olyā; also known as Bāb Bīd-e ‘Olyā (Persian: باب بيدعليا), Bāb Bīd-e Bālā and Bābīd-e ‘Olyā) is a village in Javaran Rural District, Hanza District, Rabor County, Kerman Province, Iran. At the 2006 census, its population was 146, in 37 families.
