= Zardalu =

Zardalu (Persian: زردآلو) may refer to:

- Zardalu, Ardabil, Iran
- Zardalu, Kerman, Iran
- Zardalu Sofla, Lorestan Province, Iran
- Zardalu, an alien race in Charles Sheffield's Heritage Universe books.
