= Seh Darreh, Kerman =

Seh Darreh سه دره
- Village
- Location within Iran
- Coordinates: 29°13′58″N 56°54′38″E
- Country: Iran
- Province: Kerman
- County: Rabor
- Bakhsh: Central
- Rural District: Rabor

Population (2006)
  - Total: 44
- Time zone: UTC+3:30 (IRST)
  - Summer (DST): UTC+4:30 (IRDT)

Seh Darreh (Persian: سه دره; also known as Seh Darreh’ī) is a village in Rabor Rural District, in the Central District of Rabor County, Kerman Province, Iran. At the 2006 census, its population was 44, in 11 families.
