= Godak (disambiguation) =

Godak is a town in Nepal.

Godak may also refer to the following places:

- Godak Minaret Mosque, in Sheki, Azerbaijan
- Kotk, Kerman, Iran
