= Kangari, Rabor =

Village in Kerman province, Iran

Kangari Persian: كنگري
- Village
- Location within Iran
- Coordinates: 29°16′49″N 57°06′30″E
- Country: Iran
- Province: Kerman
- County: Rabor
- District: Hanza
- Rural District: Hanza

Population (2016)
  - Total: 415
- Time zone: UTC+3:30 (IRST)

Kangari (Persian: كنگري) (Note: Also romanized as Kangarī) is a village in Hanza Rural District of Hanza District, Rabor County, Kerman province, Iran.

== Demographics ==
=== Population ===
At the time of the 2006 National Census, the village's population was 705 in 121 households, when it was in the former Rabor District of Baft County. The following census in 2011 counted 438 people in 117 households, by which time the district had been separated from the county in the establishment of Rabor County. The rural district was transferred to the new Hanza District. The 2016 census measured the population of the village as 415 people in 143 households. It was the most populous village in its rural district.
