= Qanat Bid, Rabor =

Qanat Bid قنات بيد
- Village
- Location within Iran
- Coordinates: 29°14′10″N 56°55′18″E
- Country: Iran
- Province: Kerman
- County: Rabor
- Bakhsh: Central
- Rural District: Rabor

Population (2006)
  - Total: 40
- Time zone: UTC+3:30 (IRST)
  - Summer (DST): UTC+4:30 (IRDT)

Qanat Bid (Persian: قنات بيد, also Romanized as Qanāt Bīd; also known as Kahn-e Bīd) is a village in Rabor Rural District, in the Central District of Rabor County, Kerman Province, Iran. At the 2006 census, its population was 40, in 12 families.
