= Naniz =

Naniz (Persian: ننيز) may refer to:

- Naniz-e Olya
- Naniz-e Sofla
