= Bid-e Shirin-e Do =

Bid-e Shirin-e Do بيدشيرين2
- Village
- Location within Iran
- Coordinates: 29°21′36″N 57°18′36″E
- Country: Iran
- Province: Kerman
- County: Rabor
- Bakhsh: Hanza
- Rural District: Hanza

Population (2006)
  - Total: 160
- Time zone: UTC+3:30 (IRST)
  - Summer (DST): UTC+4:30 (IRDT)

Bid-e Shirin-e Do (Persian: بيدشيرين2, also Romanized as Bīd-e Shīrīn-e Do; also known as Bīd-e Shīrīn) is a village in Hanza Rural District, Hanza District, Rabor County, Kerman Province, Iran. At the 2006 census, its population was 160, in 34 families.
