= Javaran =

Village in Kerman province, Iran

Javaran Persian: جواران
- Village
- Location within Iran
- Coordinates: 29°19′04″N 57°00′17″E
- Country: Iran
- Province: Kerman
- County: Rabor
- District: Hanza
- Rural District: Javaran

Population (2016)
  - Total: 652
- Time zone: UTC+3:30 (IRST)

Javaran (Persian: جواران) (Note: Also romanized as Javārān; also known as Jawārūn, Marjān (مرجان), and Marjun) is a village in Javaran Rural District of Hanza District, Rabor County, Kerman province, Iran.

== Demographics ==
=== Population ===
At the time of the 2006 National Census, the village's population was 804 in 213 households, when it was in the former Rabor District of Baft County. The following census in 2011 counted 653 people in 215 households, by which time the district had been separated from the county in the establishment of Rabor County. The rural district was transferred to the new Hanza District. The 2016 census measured the population of the village as 652 people in 269 households. It was the most populous village in its rural district.
