= Naniz-e Sofla =

Naniz-e Sofla نينزسفلي
- Village
- Location within Iran
- Coordinates: 29°18′46″N 56°55′35″E
- Country: Iran
- Province: Kerman
- County: Rabor
- Bakhsh: Central
- Rural District: Siyah Banuiyeh

Population (2006)
  - Total: 155
- Time zone: UTC+3:30 (IRST)
  - Summer (DST): UTC+4:30 (IRDT)

Naniz-e Sofla (Persian: نينزسفلي, also Romanized as Nanīz-e Soflá and Nanīz Soflá; also known as Nanīz, Nanīz-e Pā’īn, and Nanūke-e Pā’īn) is a village in Siyah Banuiyeh Rural District, in the Central District of Rabor County, Kerman Province, Iran. At the 2006 census, its population was 155, in 43 families.
