= Sanguiyeh =

Sanguiyeh (Persian: سنگوييه) may refer to:

- Sanguiyeh, Jiroft
- Sanguiyeh, Rabor
