= Sarhanger, Rabor =

Sarhanger سرهنگر
- Village
- Location within Iran
- Coordinates: 29°16′41″N 57°10′17″E
- Country: Iran
- Province: Kerman
- County: Rabor
- Bakhsh: Hanza
- Rural District: Hanza

Population (2006)
  - Total: 213
- Time zone: UTC+3:30 (IRST)
  - Summer (DST): UTC+4:30 (IRDT)

Sarhanger (Persian: سرهنگر) is a village in Hanza Rural District, Hanza District, Rabor County, Kerman Province, Iran. At the 2006 census, its population was 213, in 50 families.
