= Yakhmar =

Yakhmar يخمر
- Village
- Location within Iran
- Coordinates: 29°16′14″N 56°58′47″E
- Country: Iran
- Province: Kerman
- County: Rabor
- Bakhsh: Hanza
- Rural District: Javaran

Population (2006)
  - Total: 46
- Time zone: UTC+3:30 (IRST)
  - Summer (DST): UTC+4:30 (IRDT)

Yakhmar (Persian: يخمر; also known as Yakh Mūr and Yekmūr) is a village in Javaran Rural District, Hanza District, Rabor County, Kerman Province, Iran. At the 2006 census, its population was 46, in 10 families.
