= Gerinuiyeh =

Gerinuiyeh گرينوييه
- Village
- Location within Iran
- Coordinates: 29°16′46″N 57°00′00″E
- Country: Iran
- Province: Kerman
- County: Rabor
- Bakhsh: Hanza
- Rural District: Javaran

Population (2006)
  - Total: 144
- Time zone: UTC+3:30 (IRST)
  - Summer (DST): UTC+4:30 (IRDT)

Gerinuiyeh (Persian: گرينوييه, also Romanized as Gerīnū’īyeh; also known as Garīnow and Gerīnū) is a village in Javaran Rural District, Hanza District, Rabor County, Kerman Province, Iran. At the 2006 census, its population was 144, in 34 families.
