= Koldan, Rabor =

Koldan كلدان
- Village
- Location within Iran
- Coordinates: 29°07′02″N 56°59′19″E
- Country: Iran
- Province: Kerman
- County: Rabor
- Bakhsh: Hanza
- Rural District: Javaran

Population (2006)
  - Total: 222
- Time zone: UTC+3:30 (IRST)
  - Summer (DST): UTC+4:30 (IRDT)

Koldan (Persian: كلدان, also Romanized as Koldān; also known as Goldān) is a village in Javaran Rural District, Hanza District, Rabor County, Kerman Province, Iran. At the 2006 census, its population was 222, in 51 families.
