= Yakh Mur =

Yakh Mur (Persian: يخمور) may refer to:

- Yakh Mur, Baft
- Yakh Mur,, Rabor
