= Qanat Bid =

Qanat Bid or Qanat-e Bid (Persian: قنات بيد) may refer to:

- Qanat-e Bid, Jiroft
- Qanat Bid 1, Jiroft County
- Qanat Bid 2, Jiroft County
- Qanat Bid, Rabor
