= Gerinu =

Gerinu or Gerinow (Persian: گرينو) may refer to:

- Garinuiyeh
- Gerinuiyeh
