= Tariku =

Tariku may refer to:

- Tariku River, a river in the Papua province of Indonesia
- Tariku language, one of the Lakes Plain languages
- Tarikuiyeh, village in Kerman Province, Iran, also known as Tārīkū

== Name ==
Tariku (Amharic: ታሪኩ) is a male name of Ethiopian origin that may refer to:

- Tariku Bekele (born 1987), Ethiopian long-distance runner and Olympic medallist
- Tariku Jufar (born 1984), Ethiopian marathon runner
- Nahom Mesfin Tariku (born 1989), Ethiopian steeplechase runner
