= Hanjan =

Hanjan (Persian: هنجان or هنجن) may refer to:

- Hanjan, Isfahan (هنجن - Hanjan)
- Hanjan, Kerman (هنجان - Hanjān)
- Hanjan, Kulgam (هنجان- "Hanjan")
