= Hanza, Rabor =

City in Kerman province, Iran

Hanza Persian: هنزا
- City
- Location within Iran
- Coordinates: 29°18′03″N 57°11′20″E
- Country: Iran
- Province: Kerman
- County: Rabor
- District: Hanza

Population (2016)
  - Total: 1,452
- Time zone: UTC+3:30 (IRST)

Hanza (Persian: هنزا) (Note: Also romanized as Hanzā and Hanzā’; also known as Hanzar) is a city in, and the capital of, Hanza District of Rabor County, Kerman province, Iran. It also serves as the administrative center for Hanza Rural District.

== Demographics ==
=== Population ===
At the time of the 2006 National Census, Hanza's population was 2,388 in 506 households, when it was a village in Hanza Rural District of the former Rabor District of Baft County. The following census in 2011 counted 1,309 people in 415 households, by which time the district had been separated from the county in the establishment of Rabor County. The rural district was transferred to the new Hanza District. The 2016 census measured the population as 1,452 people in 460 households, when the village been elevated to the status of a city.
