= Esker (disambiguation) =

An esker is a ridge of sand and gravel.

Esker may also refer to:

- An eschar, slough or dead tissue
- Esker, Iran, a village in Kerman Province, Iran
- Esker, County Tyrone, a townland in County Tyrone, Northern Ireland
- Esker, County Galway, a townland in East Galway
- Esker SA, a French software company
