= Underground Bath (Sheki) =

- Azerbaijani: Yeraltı hamam
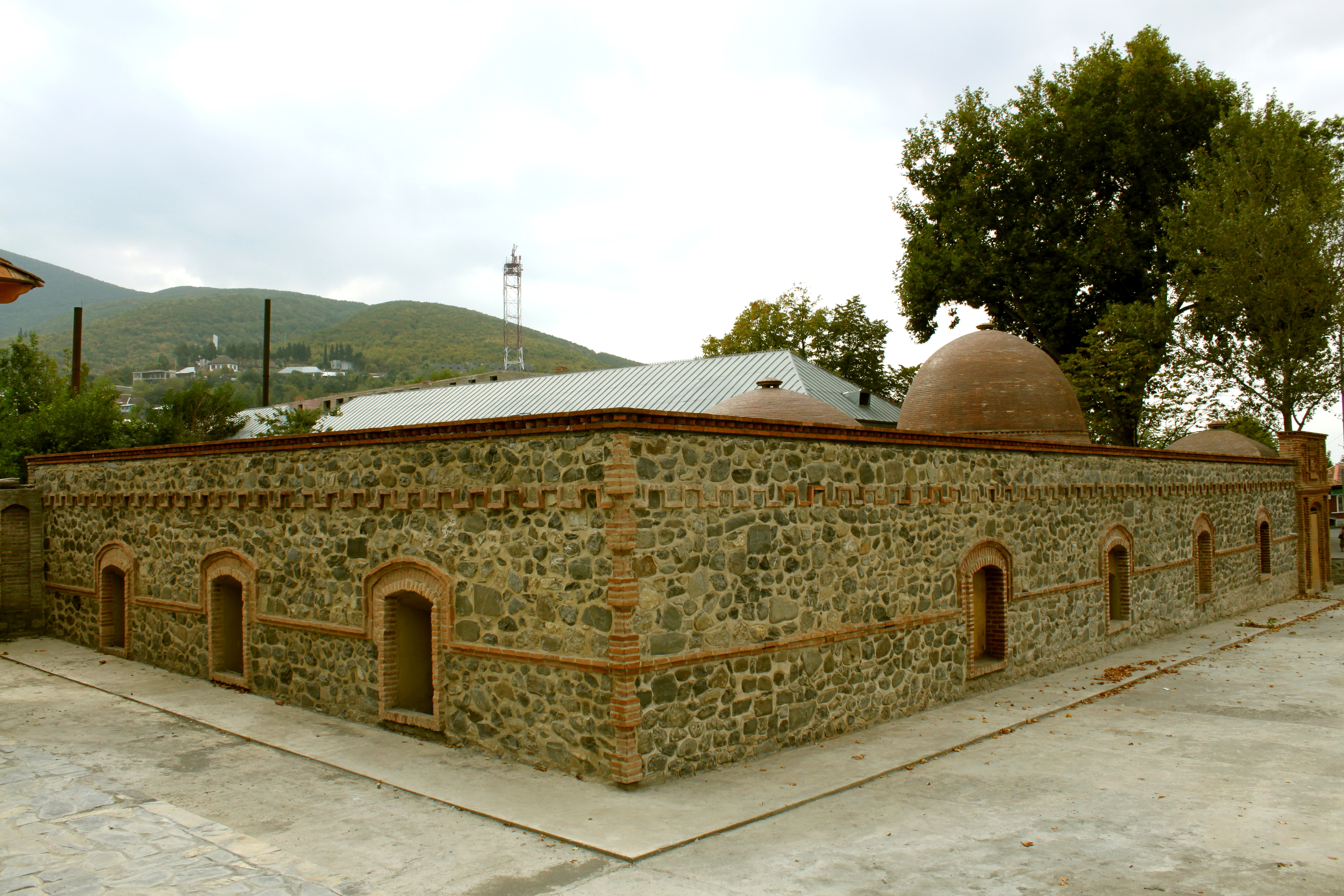
- External view of the bath
- Interactive map of the Underground Bath area

General information
- Type: Bath
- Architectural style: Azerbaijani architecture
- Location: Shaki, Azerbaijan, 20 January street 35.
- Coordinates: 41.20300378°N 47.181177°E
- Completed: XIX century

UNESCO World Heritage Site
- Official name: Historic Centre of Sheki with the Khan’s Palace
- Criteria: Cultural: (ii), (v)
- Designated: 2019 (43rd session)
- Reference no.: 1549
- Region: Western Asia
- Area: 120.5 ha
- Buffer zone: 146 ha

The Underground Bath or Abdulsalam Bath (Azerbaijani: Yeraltı hamam or Abdulsalam hamamı), located in Sheki, Azerbaijan, is a 19th- century landmark building. Situated in the heart of the Upper Main State Historical-Architectural Reserve, it is no longer used as intended.

== History ==
The bath was built by entrepreneur Abdulsalam in the 19th century. The building, consisting of two great halls and wide rooms, is popularly known as the "Underground Bath" because part of it is located underground. And it is located within the Juma Mosque and religious school complex. The bath, refurbished by the Sheki Scientific Restoration and Production Union in 1995, is no longer used as intended. The bath includes a dressing room, a bathing area, two special rooms, a hallway, and a cold and hot water reservoir, called “xəzinə” (treasury). The 70 square-meter dressing room is about seven meters in width, ten meters in length and 12 meters in height. The 50 square-meter bathing area is five meters in width, ten meters in lengths, and wight meters in height. Rooms: I – covering an area of 25 square meters is five meters in width and five meters in length. II – covering an area of 7.5 square meters is three meters in width, two and half meters in length. Its total area is 89 square meters. The thickness of the wall is 80 centimeters. The building is 4 meters below ground level from the outside.

== Photos ==
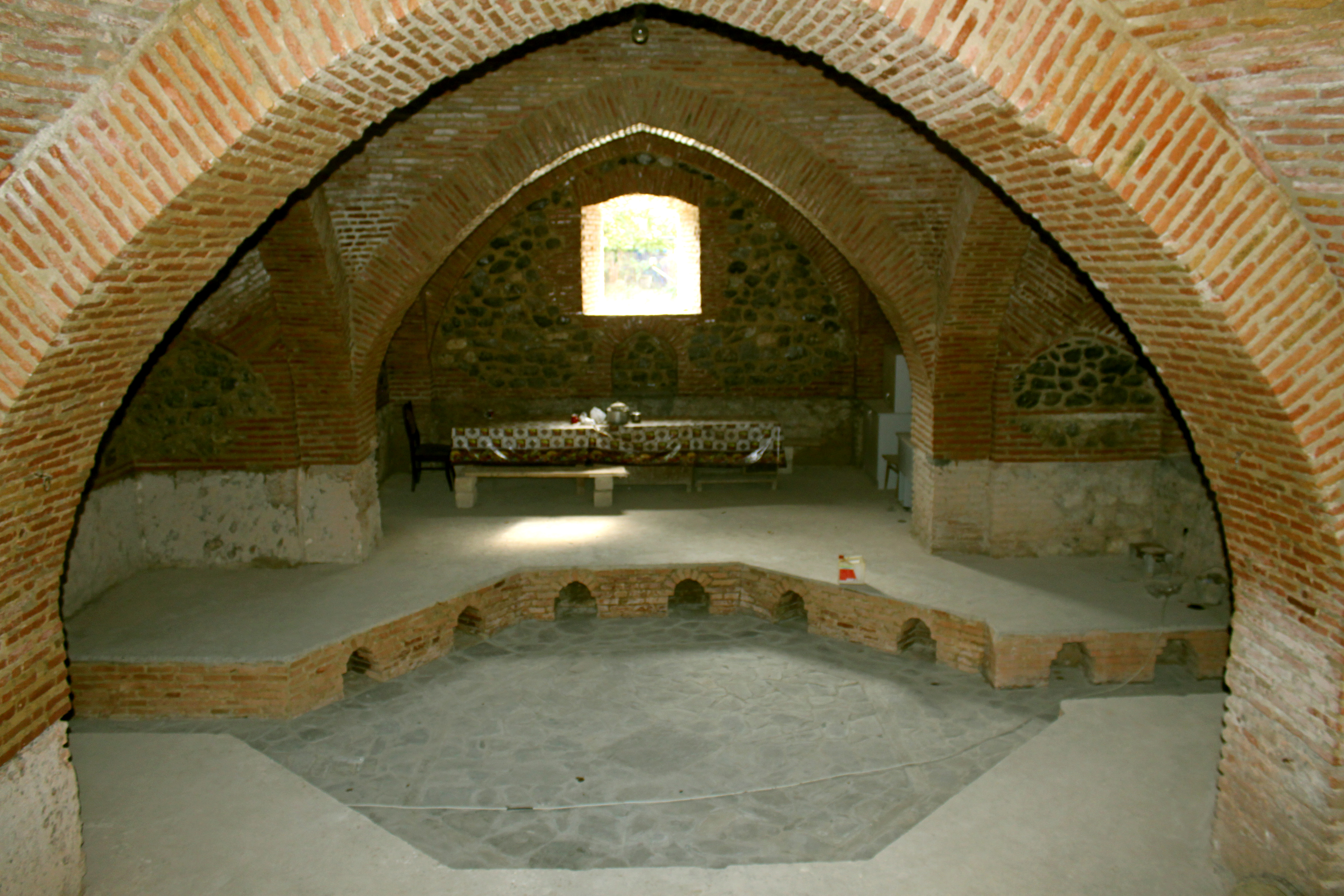

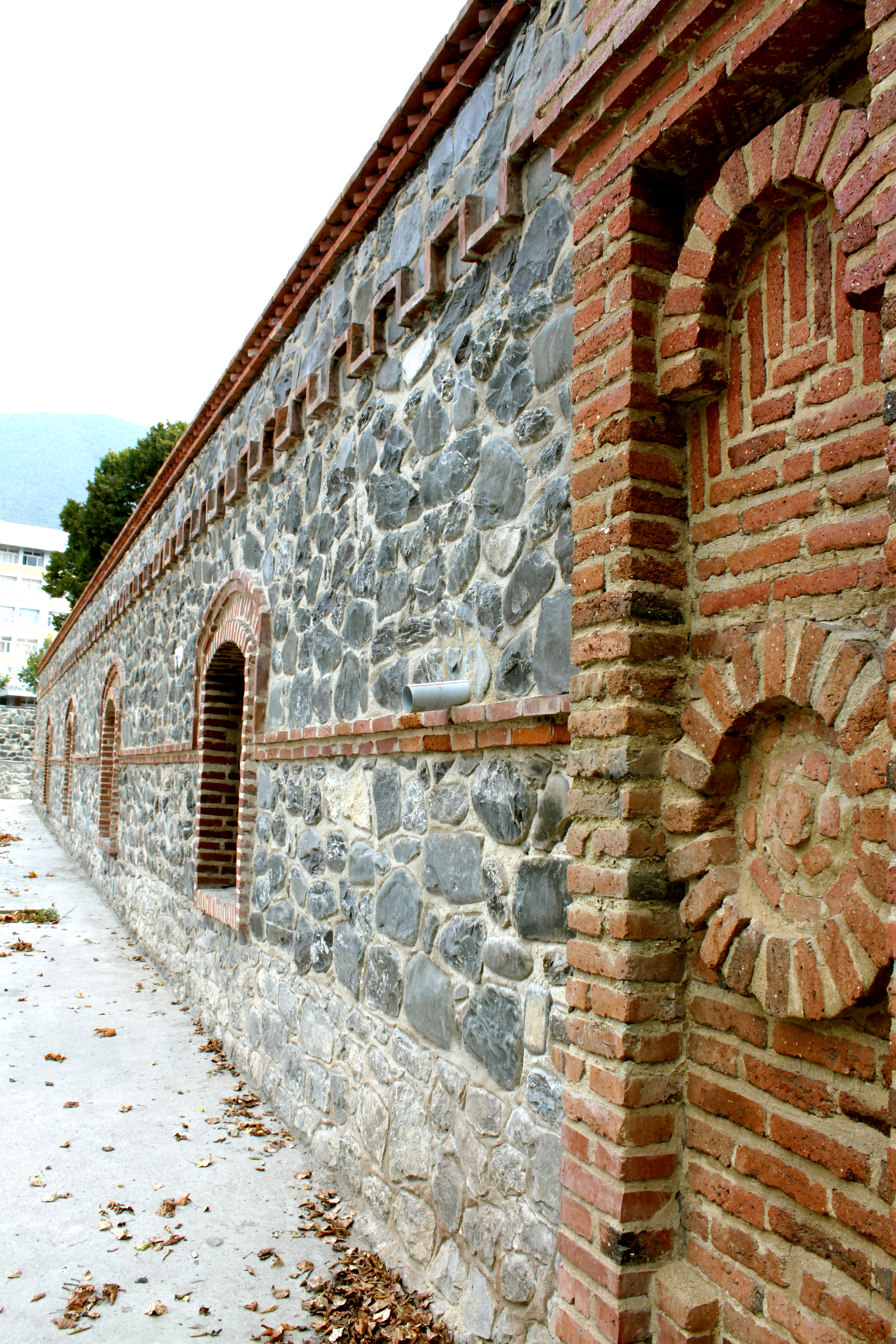

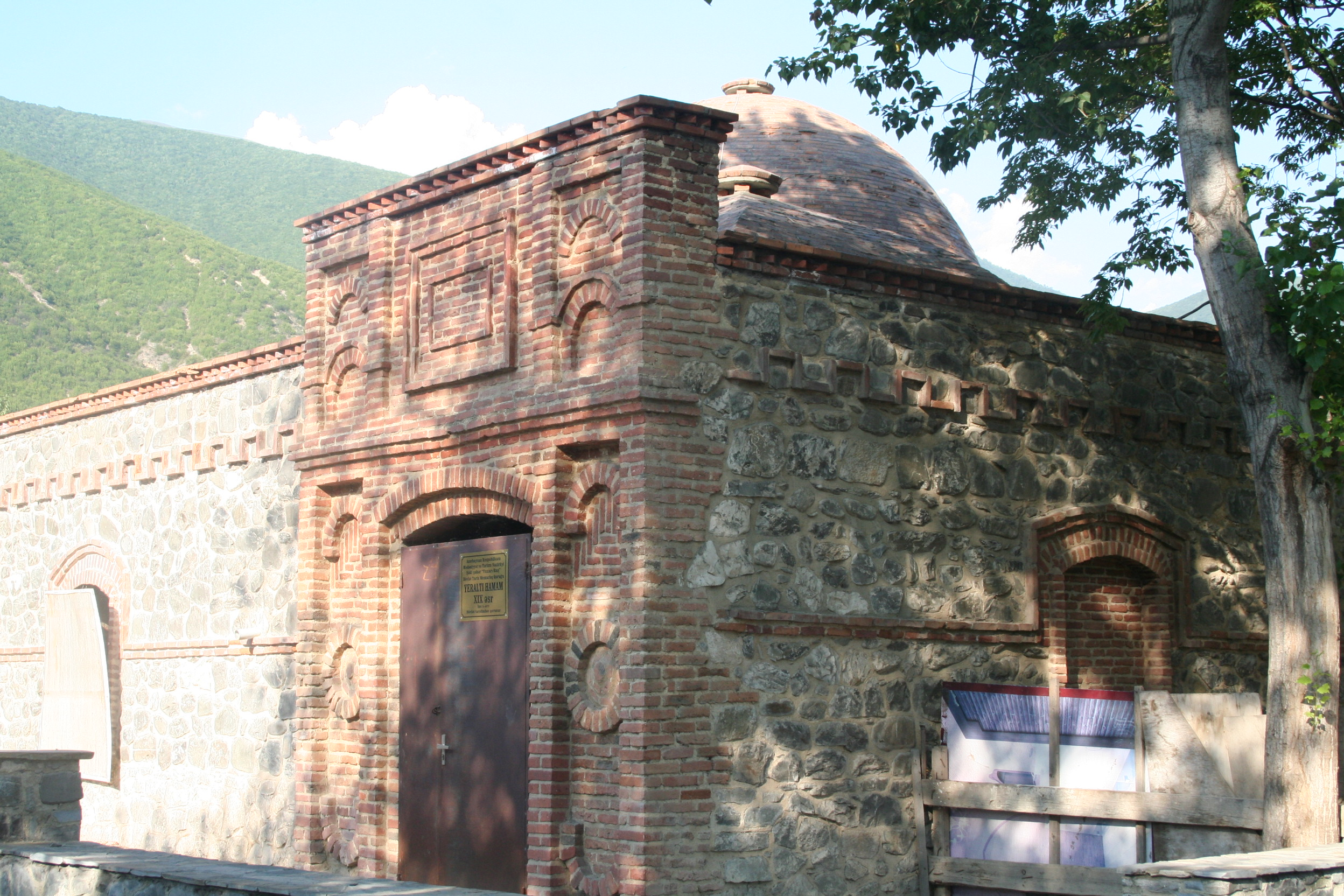

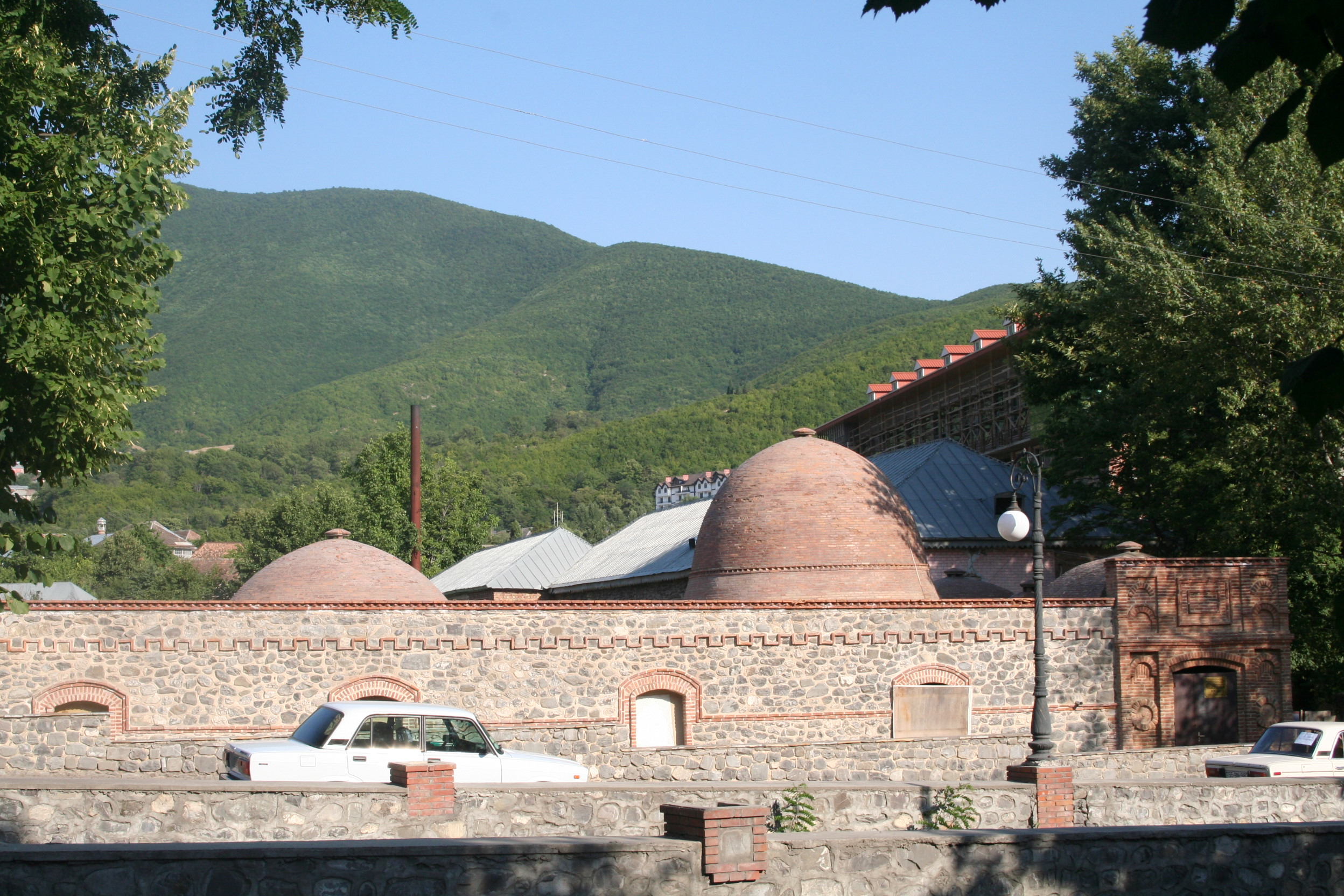

== See also ==
- Shaki Caravanserai
- Juma Mosque in Sheki
- Palace of Shaki Khans
