= Naniz-e Olya =

Naniz-e Olya ننيزعليا
- Village
- Location within Iran
- Coordinates: 29°19′22″N 56°54′44″E
- Country: Iran
- Province: Kerman
- County: Rabor
- Bakhsh: Central
- Rural District: Siyah Banuiyeh

Population (2006)
  - Total: 778
- Time zone: UTC+3:30 (IRST)
  - Summer (DST): UTC+4:30 (IRDT)

Naniz-e Olya (Persian: ننيزعليا, also romanized as Nanīz-e ‘Olyā; also known as Nanīz Bālā, Nanīz-e Bālā, and Nanūk-e Bālā) is a village in Siyah Banuiyeh Rural District, in the Central District of Rabor County, Kerman Province, Iran. At the 2006 census, its population was 778, in 195 families.
