= Juma Mosque in Sheki =

Mosque in Azerbaijan

- Azerbaijani: Şəki Cümə Məscdi; Arabic: مسجد الجمعة (شاكي)
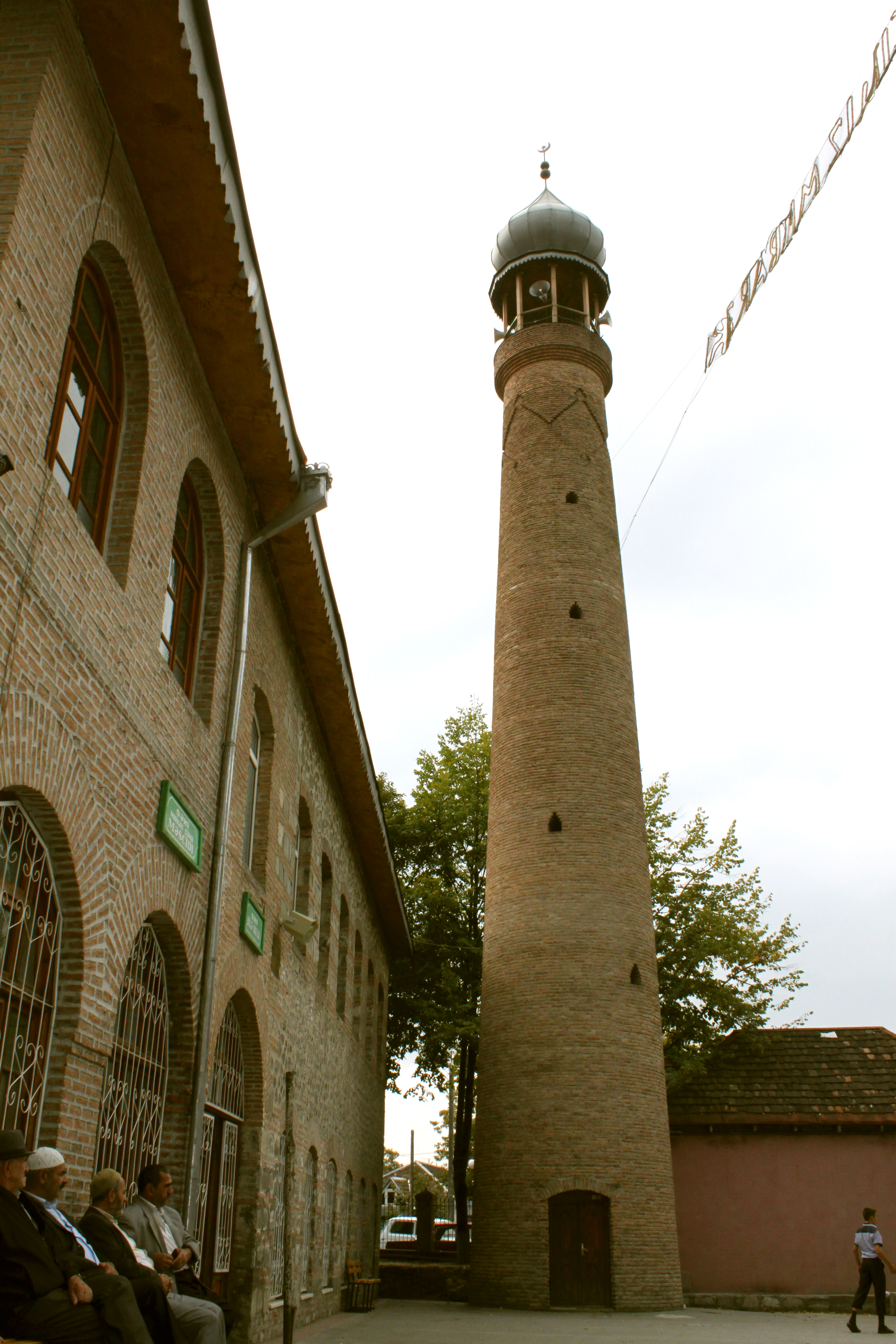
- The mosque minaret in 2013

- Location of the mosque in Azerbaijan

Religion
- Affiliation: Islam
- Ecclesiastical or organizational status: Mosque
- Status: Active

Location
- Location: Sheki
- Country: Azerbaijan
- Interactive map of Juma Mosque in Sheki
- Coordinates: 41°12′9″N 47°10′52″E

Architecture
- Type: Mosque architecture
- Groundbreaking: 1900
- Completed: 1914

Specifications
- Minaret: One
- Minaret height: 28.5 m (94 ft)
- Materials: Limestone; brick

UNESCO World Heritage Site
- Official name: "Khan's Palace, Sheki's Historical Center"
- Criteria: Cultural: (ii), (v)
- Designated: 2019 (43rd Session)
- Reference no.: 1549

The Sheki Juma Mosque (Azerbaijani: Şəki Cümə Məscdi; Arabic: مسجد الجمعة (شاكي)) is a mosque and historical architectural monument, located in the territory of the Yukhari Bash State Historical-Architectural Reserve in Sheki, Azerbaijan.

Completed in 1914, the mosque was included in the list of immovable historical and cultural monuments of local importance by decision No. 132 issued by the Cabinet of Ministers of the Republic of Azerbaijan on August 2, 2001. On July 7, 2019, as part of the "Khan's Palace, Sheki's Historical Center", the Sheki Juma Mosque was included in the UNESCO World Heritage List.

== History ==
Sheki Juma mosque was built between 1900 and 1914 in the Dabbagkhana (Tannery) quarter of Sheki. The mosque was built as a complex together with the madrasa and underground bath next to it. Based on the date engraved on the stone, it can be said that the construction of the mosque was completed in 1914 with the construction of an additional porch, cell and minaret. Later, a madrasah was built next to the mosque. The madrasah is connected to the porch of the mosque.

=== After the Soviet occupation ===
After the Soviet occupation, they began to fight against religion at an official speed since 1928. In December of the same year, the Central Committee of the Communist Party of Azerbaijan handed over many mosques, churches and synagogues to clubs for use in educational purposes. If in 1917 there were 3,000 mosques in Azerbaijan, in 1927 this number was 1,700, and in 1933 it was 17.

The minaret of Sheki Juma Mosque was also destroyed after the occupation. The building of the mosque was used as a sports school. To adapt the building to a gym, the inner balcony of the prayer hall was removed.

In 1988, the building of the mosque burned down. In 1989, measurement works were carried out in the mosque and a restoration project was prepared. During the excavation in the prayer hall of the mosque, the place of the inner wall on the side of the porch was found, and the inner porch was restored together with this wall. Later, the windows closed with masonry were opened and restored based on the dimension lines. Four large columns were placed in the interior based on the project, and the mihrab of the mosque was restored.

=== After independence ===
The minaret of the mosque was designed based on a photograph found in the archive and restored to a height of 28.5 m (94 ft) from the foundation to the top. The restoration of the minaret was completed in 1991.

The mosque was included in the list of immovable historical and cultural monuments of local importance by decision No. 132 issued by the Cabinet of Ministers of the Republic of Azerbaijan on August 2, 200.

Since 2001, the historical part of the city of Sheki has been selected as a candidate for the UNESCO World Heritage List. On July 7, 2019, "Historical center of Sheki together with the Khan Palace" was included in the UNESCO World Heritage List. The decision was made at the 43rd session of the UNESCO World Heritage Committee held at the Baku Congress Center. The Sheki Juma mosque, located in the historical center of the city of Sheki, is also included in the World Heritage Site.

In 1993, the Sheki Islamic Madrasah was opened here by the instructions of the Sheki Executive Judge Chingiz Efendiyev. The madrasah was registered by the Ministry of Justice in 1996. Students studying here receive both religious and secular education.

== Architecture ==
In the construction of the mosque, local construction materials, limestone and baked bricks were used. According to the planned structure, it consisted of an arched, columned hall, divided into sections with stones and trees, and allowed to cover the large passage in the building. The ten-step pulpit made of wood was decorated with netting. The 28.5 m-high (94 ft) minaret was built a few meters away from the mosque building. The minaret, which thins upwards, was decorated with brick masonry and relief patterns.

The interior of the mosque is simple. It is used as a place of worship, and its cells as a madrasa. The N-shaped mosque complex has two floors. There is a prayer hall for women on the second floor. The main façade is decorated with brick patterns.

== Gallery ==
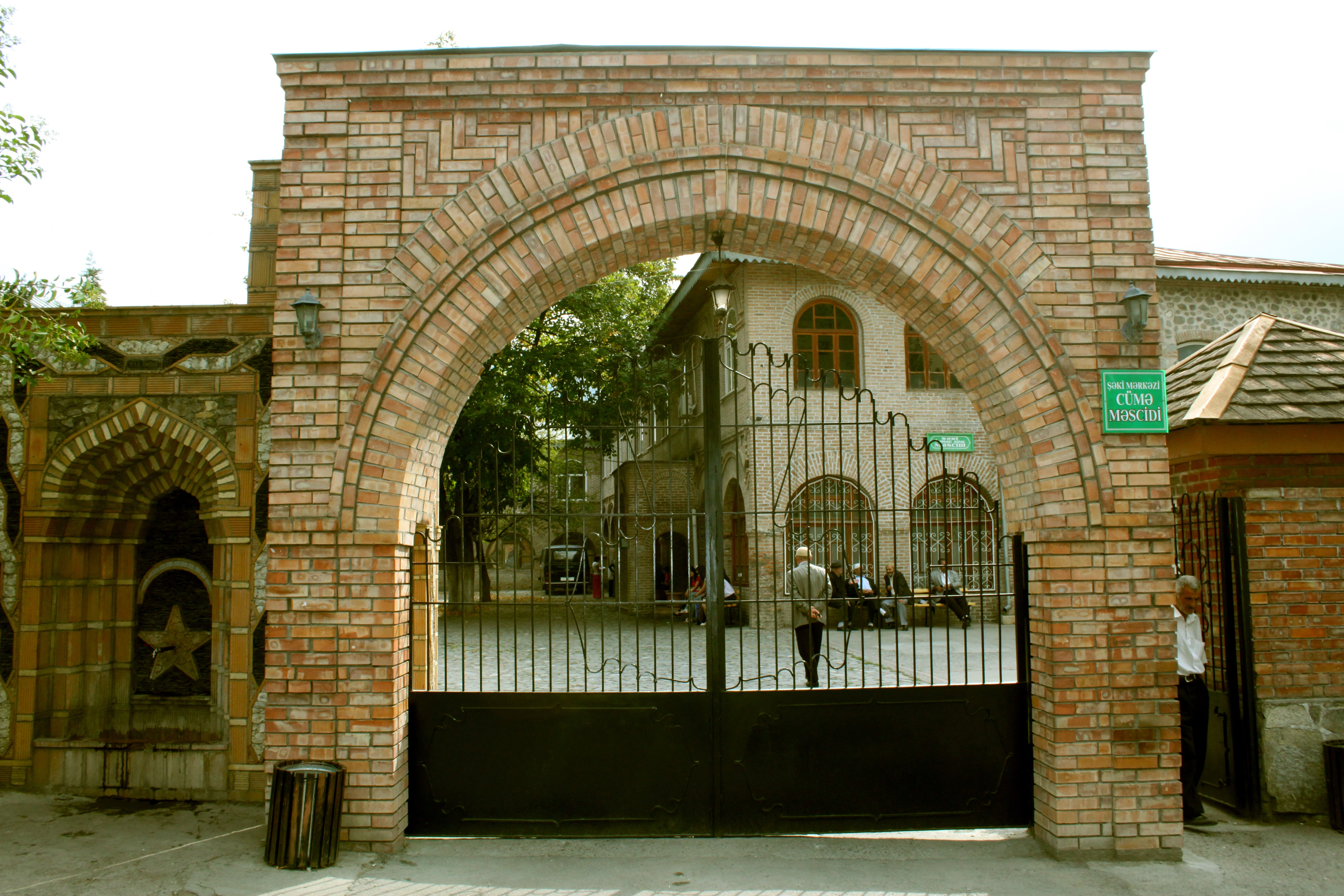

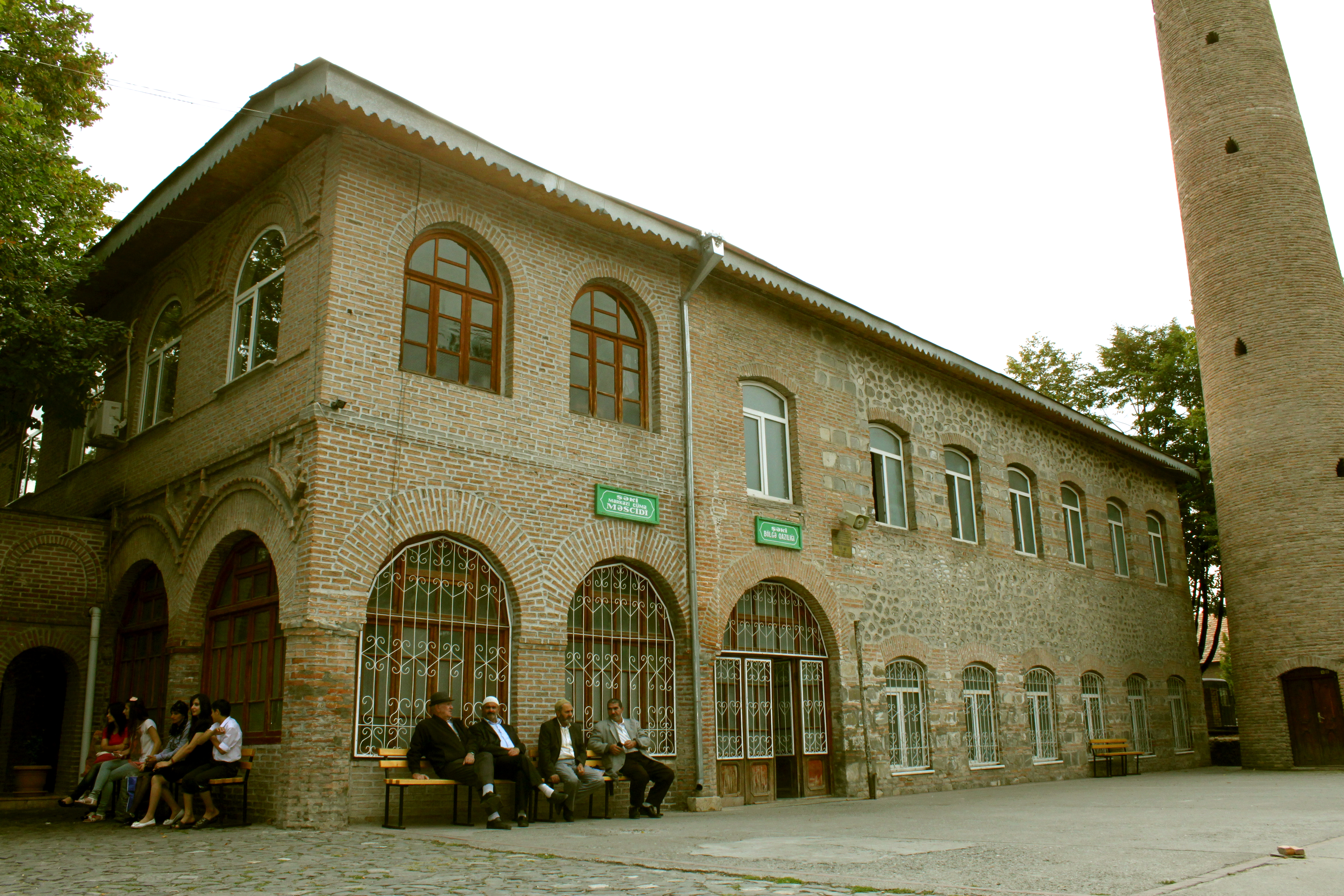

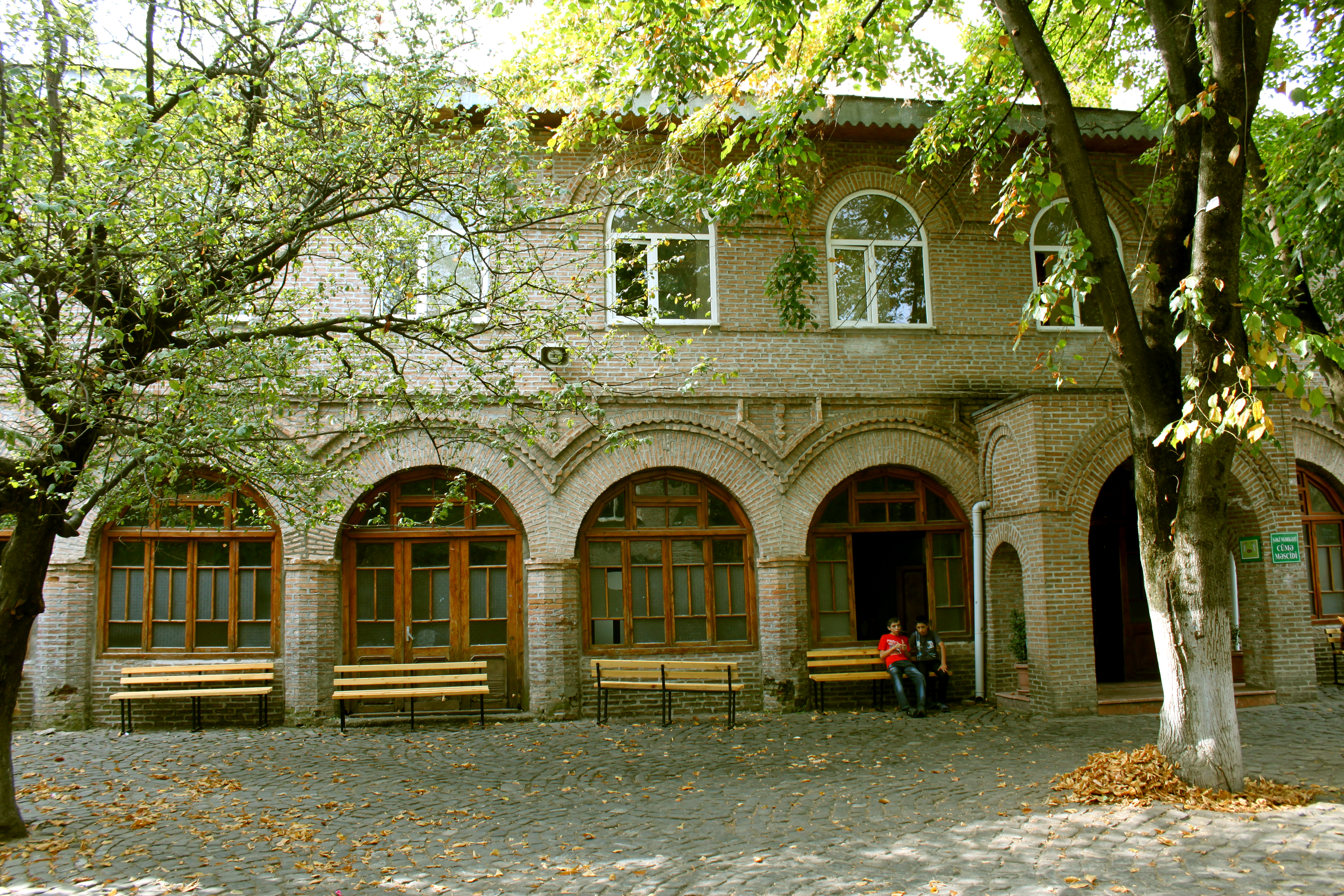

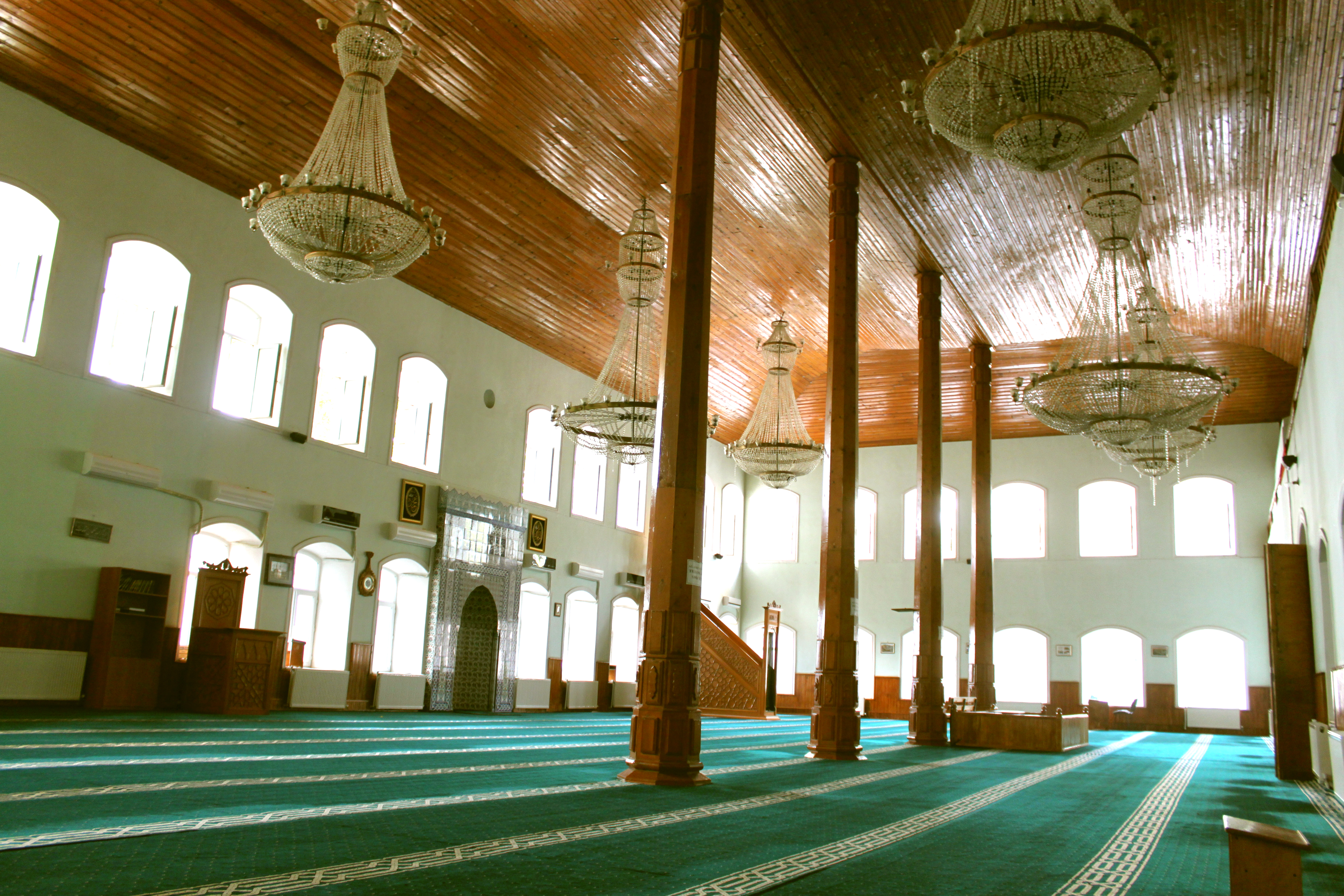

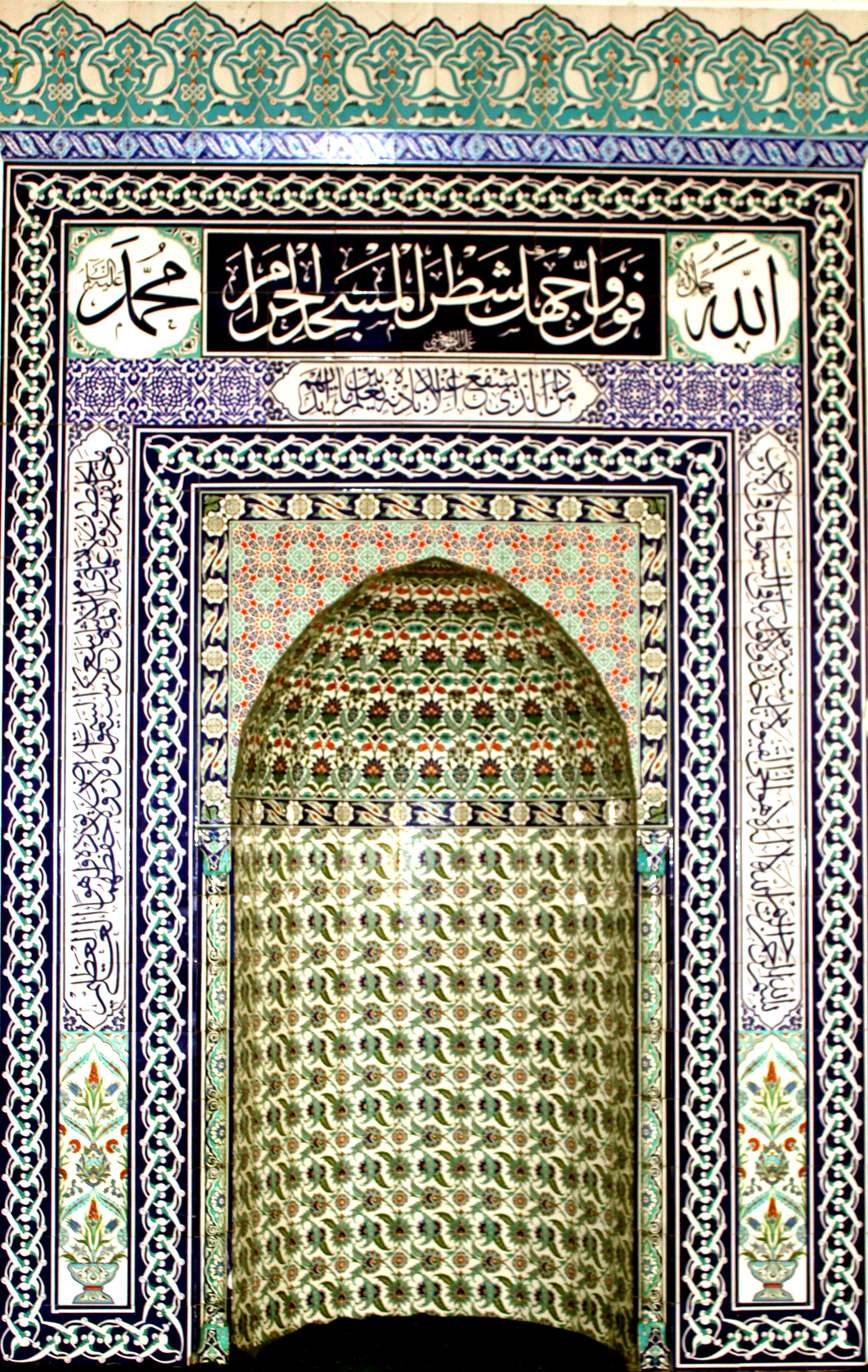

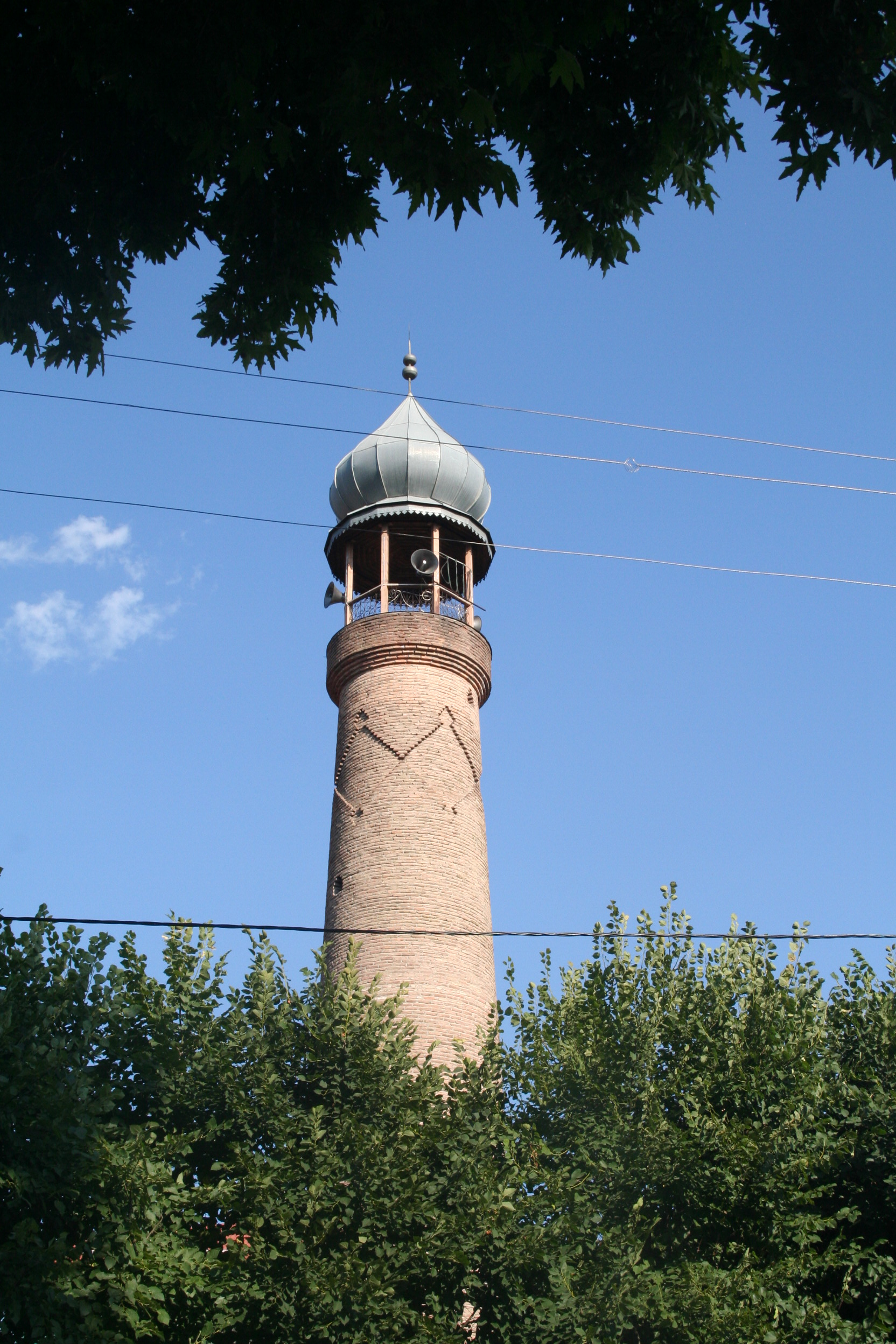

== See also ==
- Islam in Azerbaijan
- List of mosques in Azerbaijan
- Godak minaret
