= Gazuiyeh, Bardsir =

Gazuiyeh گزوييه
- Village
- Location within Iran
- Coordinates: 29°56′41″N 56°22′17″E
- Country: Iran
- Province: Kerman
- County: Bardsir
- Bakhsh: Central
- Rural District: Kuh Panj

Population (2006)
  - Total: 108
- Time zone: UTC+3:30 (IRST)
  - Summer (DST): UTC+4:30 (IRDT)

Gazuiyeh (Persian: گزوييه, also Romanized as Gazū’īyeh; also known as Garū’īyeh (Persian: گروييه), Gaz Āb, and Gazābeh) is a village in Kuh Panj Rural District, in the Central District of Bardsir County, Kerman Province, Iran. At the 2006 census, its population was 108, in 27 families.
