= Deh Divan, Jiroft =

Deh Divan ده ديوان
- Village
- Location within Iran
- Coordinates: 29°13′17″N 57°17′47″E
- Country: Iran
- Province: Kerman
- County: Jiroft
- Bakhsh: Sarduiyeh
- Rural District: Sarduiyeh

Population (2006)
  - Total: 418
- Time zone: UTC+3:30 (IRST)
  - Summer (DST): UTC+4:30 (IRDT)

Deh Divan (Persian: ده ديوان, also Romanized as Deh Dīvān and Deh-e Dīvān; also known as Deh-e Deyūn, Hurkali, and Hūrkatī) is a village in Sarduiyeh Rural District, Sarduiyeh District, Jiroft County, Kerman Province, Iran. At the 2006 census, its population was 418, in 63 families.
