= Dasht-e Shaqin =

Dasht-e Shaqin دشت شقين
- Village
- Location within Iran
- Coordinates: 29°21′39″N 57°18′35″E
- Country: Iran
- Province: Kerman
- County: Kerman
- Bakhsh: Rayen
- Rural District: Hoseynabad-e Goruh

Population (2006)
  - Total: 26
- Time zone: UTC+3:30 (IRST)
  - Summer (DST): UTC+4:30 (IRDT)

Dasht-e Shaqin (Persian: دشت شقين, also Romanized as Dasht-e Shaqīn; also known as Dasht-e Shaghīn, Dasht-e Shaqī, Dasht-i-Shaghin, Dasht Sheqī, and Saghīn) is a village in Hoseynabad-e Goruh Rural District, Rayen District, Kerman County, Kerman Province, Iran. At the 2006 census, its population was 26, in 6 families.
