= Kangari, Jiroft =

Kangari كنگري
- Village
- Location within Iran
- Coordinates: 29°16′51″N 57°06′29″E
- Country: Iran
- Province: Kerman
- County: Jiroft
- Bakhsh: Sarduiyeh
- Rural District: Sarduiyeh

Population (2006)
  - Total: 126
- Time zone: UTC+3:30 (IRST)
  - Summer (DST): UTC+4:30 (IRDT)

Kangari (Persian: كنگري, also Romanized as Kangarī) is a village in Sarduiyeh Rural District, Sarduiyeh District, Jiroft County, Kerman Province, Iran. At the 2006 census, its population was 126, in 26 families.
