= Tombuiyeh =

Tombuiyeh تمبوئيه
- Village
- Location within Iran
- Coordinates: 29°08′52″N 56°52′08″E
- Country: Iran
- Province: Kerman
- County: Baft
- Bakhsh: Central
- Rural District: Bezenjan

Population (2006)
  - Total: 87
- Time zone: UTC+3:30 (IRST)
  - Summer (DST): UTC+4:30 (IRDT)

Tombuiyeh (Persian: تمبوئيه, also Romanized as Tombū’īyeh; also known as Tomū, Tomū’īyeh, and Yakh Mūr) is a village in Bezenjan Rural District, in the Central District of Baft County, Kerman Province, Iran. At the 2006 census, its population was 87, in 26 families.
