= Rabor =

City in Kerman province, Iran

Rabor Persian: رابر
- City
- Location within Iran
- Coordinates: 29°17′25″N 56°54′48″E
- Country: Iran
- Province: Kerman
- County: Rabor
- District: Central

Population (2016)
  - Total: 13,263
- Time zone: UTC+3:30 (IRST)

Rabor (Persian: رابر) (Note: Also romanized as Raber and Rābor; also known as Rābur and Rāhbur) is a city in the Central District of Rabor County, Kerman province, Iran, serving as capital of both the county and the district.

== Demographics ==
=== Population ===
At the time of the 2006 National Census, the city's population was 12,386 in 2,734 households, when it was capital of the former Rabor District of Baft County. The following census in 2011 counted 11,657 people in 3,016 households, by which time the district had been separated from the county in the establishment of Rabor County. Rabor was transferred to the new Central District as the county's capital. The 2016 census measured the population of the city as 13,263 people in 4,051 households.
