= Zardalu Sofla =

Zardalu Sofla زردآلو سفلي
- Village
- Location within Iran
- Coordinates: 34°06′12″N 47°51′20″E
- Country: Iran
- Province: Lorestan
- County: Delfan
- Bakhsh: Central
- Rural District: Nurabad

Population (2006)
  - Total: 14
- Time zone: UTC+3:30 (IRST)
  - Summer (DST): UTC+4:30 (IRDT)

Zardalu Sofla (Persian: زردآلو سفلي, also Romanized as Zardālū Soflá; also known as Zardālū) is a village in Nurabad Rural District, in the Central District of Delfan County, Lorestan Province, Iran.

At the 2006 census, the village's population was 14, distributed over 4 families.
