= Seghin, Baft =

Seghin سغين
- Village
- Location within Iran
- Coordinates: 29°29′38″N 56°23′14″E
- Country: Iran
- Province: Kerman
- County: Baft
- Bakhsh: Central
- Rural District: Gughar

Population (2006)
  - Total: 10
- Time zone: UTC+3:30 (IRST)
  - Summer (DST): UTC+4:30 (IRDT)

Seghin (Persian: سغين, also Romanized as Seghīn and Saghīn) is a village in Gughar Rural District, in the Central District of Baft County, Kerman Province, Iran.

At the 2006 census, its population was 10, in 4 families.
