= Nar Ab =

Nar Ab ناراب
- Village
- Location within Iran
- Coordinates: 37°52′46″N 47°50′00″E
- Country: Iran
- Province: East Azerbaijan
- County: Sarab
- Bakhsh: Central
- Rural District: Molla Yaqub

Population (2006)
  - Total: 175
- Time zone: UTC+3:30 (IRST)
  - Summer (DST): UTC+4:30 (IRDT)

Nar Ab (Persian: ناراب, also Romanized as Nār Āb and Nārāb) is a village in Molla Yaqub Rural District, in the Central District of Sarab County, East Azerbaijan Province, Iran. At the 2006 census, its population was 175, in 35 families.
