= Bagh Bid, Yazd =

Bagh Bid باغ بيد
- village
- Location within Iran
- Coordinates: 31°28′44″N 54°04′23″E
- Country: Iran
- Province: Yazd
- County: Taft
- Bakhsh: Nir
- Rural District: Sakhvid

Government
  - President: Ileia Rezaei Baghbidi

Population (2006)
  - Total: 106
- Time zone: UTC+3:30 (IRST)
  - Summer (DST): UTC+4:30 (IRDT)

Bagh Bid (Persian: باغ بيد, also Romanized as Bāgh Bīd, Bāgh-i-Bīd, and Bāghbīd) is a village in Sakhvid Rural District, Nir District, Taft County, Yazd Province, Iran. At the 2006 census, its population was 106, in 37 families.
