= Narabi =

Narabi نرابي
- Village
- Location within Iran
- Coordinates: 28°53′00″N 57°29′58″E
- Country: Iran
- Province: Kerman
- County: Jiroft
- Bakhsh: Central
- Rural District: Halil

Population (2006)
  - Total: 32
- Time zone: UTC+3:30 (IRST)
  - Summer (DST): UTC+4:30 (IRDT)

Narabi (Persian: نرابي, also Romanized as Narābī; also known as Narāb, Narāb Bālā, and Narāb-e Bālā) is a village in Halil Rural District, in the Central District of Jiroft County, Kerman Province, Iran. At the 2006 census, its population was 32, in 5 families.
