= Bid-e Shirin, Kerman =

Bid-e Shirin بيدشيرين
- Village
- Location within Iran
- Coordinates: 29°11′40″N 57°19′38″E
- Country: Iran
- Province: Kerman
- County: Kerman
- Bakhsh: Rayen
- Rural District: Hoseynabad-e Goruh

Population (2006)
  - Total: 86
- Time zone: UTC+3:30 (IRST)
  - Summer (DST): UTC+4:30 (IRDT)

Bid-e Shirin (Persian: بيدشيرين, also Romanized as Bīd-e Shīrīn) is a village in Hoseynabad-e Goruh Rural District, Rayen District, Kerman County, Kerman Province, Iran. At the 2006 census, its population was 86, in 21 families.
