= Qanat-e Bid, Jiroft =

Qanat-e Bid قنات بيد
- Village
- Location within Iran
- Coordinates: 29°11′51″N 57°28′11″E
- Country: Iran
- Province: Kerman
- County: Jiroft
- Bakhsh: Sarduiyeh
- Rural District: Gevar

Population (2006)
  - Total: 53
- Time zone: UTC+3:30 (IRST)
  - Summer (DST): UTC+4:30 (IRDT)

Qanat-e Bid (Persian: قنات بيد, also Romanized as Qanāt-e Bīd; also known as Qanāt-e Būd) is a village in Gevar Rural District, Sarduiyeh District, Jiroft County, Kerman Province, Iran. At the 2006 census, its population was 53, in 12 families.
