= Koldan, Jiroft =

Koldan كلدان
- Village
- Location within Iran
- Coordinates: 28°55′22″N 57°40′33″E
- Country: Iran
- Province: Kerman
- County: Jiroft
- Bakhsh: Sarduiyeh
- Rural District: Dalfard

Population (2006)
  - Total: 203
- Time zone: UTC+3:30 (IRST)
  - Summer (DST): UTC+4:30 (IRDT)

Koldan (Persian: كلدان, also Romanized as Koldān; also known as Kūledūn) is a village in Dalfard Rural District, Sarduiyeh District, Jiroft County, Kerman Province, Iran. At the 2006 census, its population was 203, in 46 families.
