= Narab, Sirjan =

Narab نراب
- Village
- Location within Iran
- Coordinates: 29°21′55″N 56°15′15″E
- Country: Iran
- Province: Kerman
- County: Sirjan
- Bakhsh: Central
- Rural District: Balvard

Population (2006)
  - Total: 106
- Time zone: UTC+3:30 (IRST)
  - Summer (DST): UTC+4:30 (IRDT)

Narab (Persian: نراب, also Romanized as Narāb; also known as Narāb-e Ḩoseynābād) is a village located in Balvard Rural District, within the Central District of Sirjan County, Kerman Province, Iran. As of the 2006 census, Narab had a population of 106 residents across 29 families. The village is situated at approximately 2,885 metres (9,468 feet) above sea level, in a mountainous area of southeastern Iran, lying near geographic coordinates 29°31′29″N 57°2′35″E.
