= Sanguiyeh, Jiroft =

Sanguiyeh سنگوئيه
- Village
- Location within Iran
- Coordinates: 28°33′35″N 57°09′37″E
- Country: Iran
- Province: Kerman
- County: Jiroft
- Bakhsh: Central
- Rural District: Esfandaqeh

Population (2006)
  - Total: 332
- Time zone: UTC+3:30 (IRST)
  - Summer (DST): UTC+4:30 (IRDT)

Sanguiyeh (Persian: سنگوئيه, also romanized as Sangū’īyeh; also known as Sangūyeh) is a village in Esfandaqeh Rural District, in the Central District of Jiroft County, Kerman Province, Iran. At the 2006 census, its population was 332, in 59 families.
