= Bagh Bid, Kerman =

Bagh Bid باغ بيد
- Village
- Location within Iran
- Coordinates: 28°49′00″N 58°06′00″E
- Country: Iran
- Province: Kerman
- County: Jiroft
- Bakhsh: Jebalbarez
- Rural District: Saghder

Population (2006)
  - Total: 57
- Time zone: UTC+3:30 (IRST)
  - Summer (DST): UTC+4:30 (IRDT)

Bagh Bid (Persian: باغ بيد, also Romanized as Bāgh Bīd) is a village in Saghder Rural District, Jebalbarez District, Jiroft County, Kerman Province, Iran. At the 2006 census, its population was 57, in 17 families.
