= Seh Darreh, Jahrom =

Coordinates: 29.2325°N 56.9119°E

Seh Darreh سه دره
- Village
- Interactive map of Seh Darreh
- Country: Iran
- Province: Fars
- County: Jahrom
- Bakhsh: Central
- Rural District: Jolgah

Population (2006)
  - Total: 54
- Time zone: UTC+3:30 (IRST)
  - Summer (DST): UTC+4:30 (IRDT)

Seh Darreh (Persian: سه دره) is a village in Jolgah Rural District, in the Central District of Jahrom County, Fars province, Iran. At the 2006 census, its population was 54, in 12 families.
