= Gazuiyeh, Shahr-e Babak =

Gazuiyeh گزوييه
- Village
- Location within Iran
- Coordinates: 30°32′05″N 54°41′58″E
- Country: Iran
- Province: Kerman
- County: Shahr-e Babak
- Bakhsh: Dehaj
- Rural District: Khabar

Population (2006)
  - Total: 133
- Time zone: UTC+3:30 (IRST)
  - Summer (DST): UTC+4:30 (IRDT)

Gazuiyeh (Persian: گزوييه, also Romanized as Gazū’īyeh) is a village in Khabar Rural District, Dehaj District, Shahr-e Babak County, Kerman Province, Iran. At the 2006 census, its population was 133, in 29 families.
