= Godak Minaret Mosque =

Mosque in Shaki, Azerbaijan

- Azerbaijani: Gödək Minarə Məscid; Persian: گودک منارالی
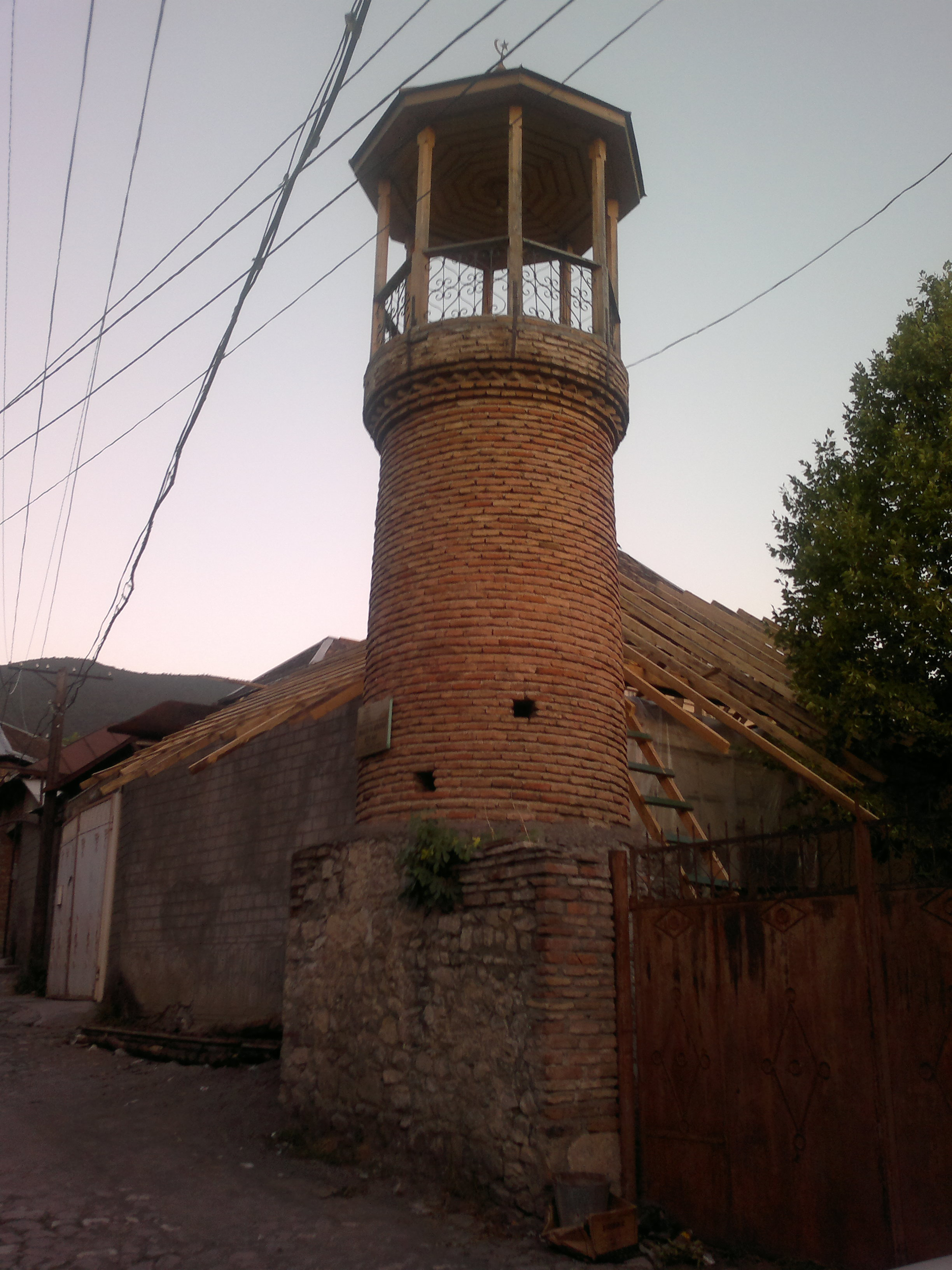
- The mosque and minaret, in 2015

- Location of the mosque in Azerbaijan

Religion
- Affiliation: Islam
- Ecclesiastical or organizational status: Mosque (c. 1811–1928); Profane use (1928–1992); Mosque (since 1992)
- Status: Active

Location
- Location: Shaki
- Country: Azerbaijan
- Interactive map of Godak Minaret Mosque
- Coordinates: 41°12′13″N 47°11′19″E

Architecture
- Type: Mosque architecture
- Style: Islamic
- Completed: 1226 AH (1811/1812 CE)

Specifications
- Minaret: One
- Materials: Stone; brick

UNESCO World Heritage Site
- Official name: "Khan's Palace, Sheki's Historical Center"
- Criteria: Cultural: (ii), (v)
- Designated: 2019 (43rd Session)
- Reference no.: 1549

The Godak Minarali Mosque (Azerbaijani: Gödək Minarə Məscid, Persian: گودک منارالی) is a mosque with minaret, and historical architectural monument, located in the territory of the Yukhari Bash State Historical-Architectural Reserve in Sheki, Azerbaijan.

The 19th-century mosque was included in the list of immovable historical and cultural monuments of local importance by decision No. 132 issued by the Cabinet of Ministers of the Republic of Azerbaijan on August 2, 2001. On July 7, 2019, as part of the "Khan's Palace, Sheki's Historical Center", the Godek Minaret Mosque was included in the UNESCO World Heritage List.

== About ==
The Godak Minarali Mosque is located in the Sarı Toprak neighborhood of Sheki city. The house of worship, which is part of the Yukhari Bash State Historical-Architecture Reserve, was built by Haji Abdurrahman Bey and Haji Sadreddin Bey in 1226 AH (1811/1812 CE), based on the inscription above the entrance door.

On the inscription is written in Arabic, translated into English as:

Everyone on earth is mortal. But the essence of the Lord, who is the owner of majesty and grace, remains forever (Surah Rahman 26-27). Those men who neither trade nor purchase distract them from remembering God and praying (Surah Noor 37). The mosque was founded on piety, a blessed mosque to implement the rulings of the Sharia, and it was built by Haji Sadreddin Bey and Abdurrahman Bey, the pilgrims of the noble and honorable region, in 1226. May God rest them in peace.

The mosque was built of stone and brick, consists of two rooms and a corridor. The ceiling of the mosque is made of mesh. Since there were no traces of the ceiling of the Sheki Khan mosque, which was restored in 2021–2022, and there was no photo of the ceiling, the restorers assembled a new ceiling for the mosque on the basis of the network on the ceiling of the Gödek Minarali Mosque and the Sheki Khan Palace. The mosque has a minaret; however is impossible to climb, as the stairs inside it have collapsed.

There are three graves in the yard. It is said that one of these graves belongs to Haji Sadreddin Bey, who died in 1254 AH (1838/1839 CE).

=== During the Soviet occupation ===
After the Soviet occupation, the fight against the religion was declared officially since 1928. In December of the same year, the Central Committee of the Communist Party of Azerbaijan handed over many mosques, churches and synagogues to clubs for use in educational purposes. If in 1917 there were 3,000 mosques in Azerbaijan, in 1927 this number was 1,700, and in 1933 it was 17.

After the occupation, a kindergarten was located in the building of the mosque.

=== After independence ===
The mosque was included in the list of immovable historical and cultural monuments of local importance by decision No. 132 issued by the Cabinet of Ministers of the Republic of Azerbaijan on August 2, 2001.

Since 2001, the historical part of the city of Sheki has been selected as a candidate for the UNESCO World Heritage List. On July 7, 2019, "the historic center of Sheki together with the Khan Palace" was included in the UNESCO World Heritage List. The decision was made at the 43rd session of the UNESCO World Heritage Committee held at the Baku Congress Center. The Gödek Minarali Mosque located in the historical center of Sheki is included in the World Heritage Site.

== Gallery ==
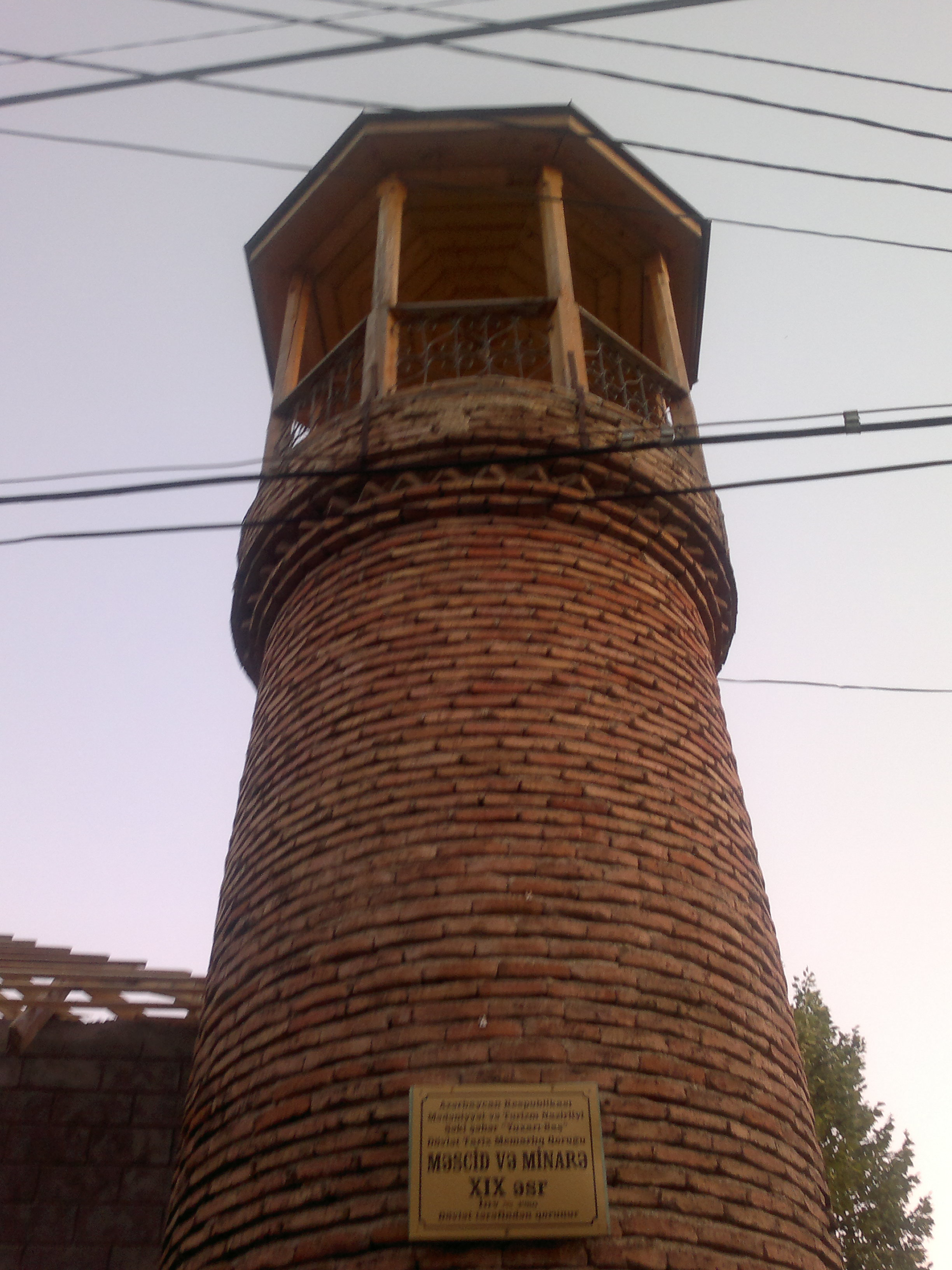

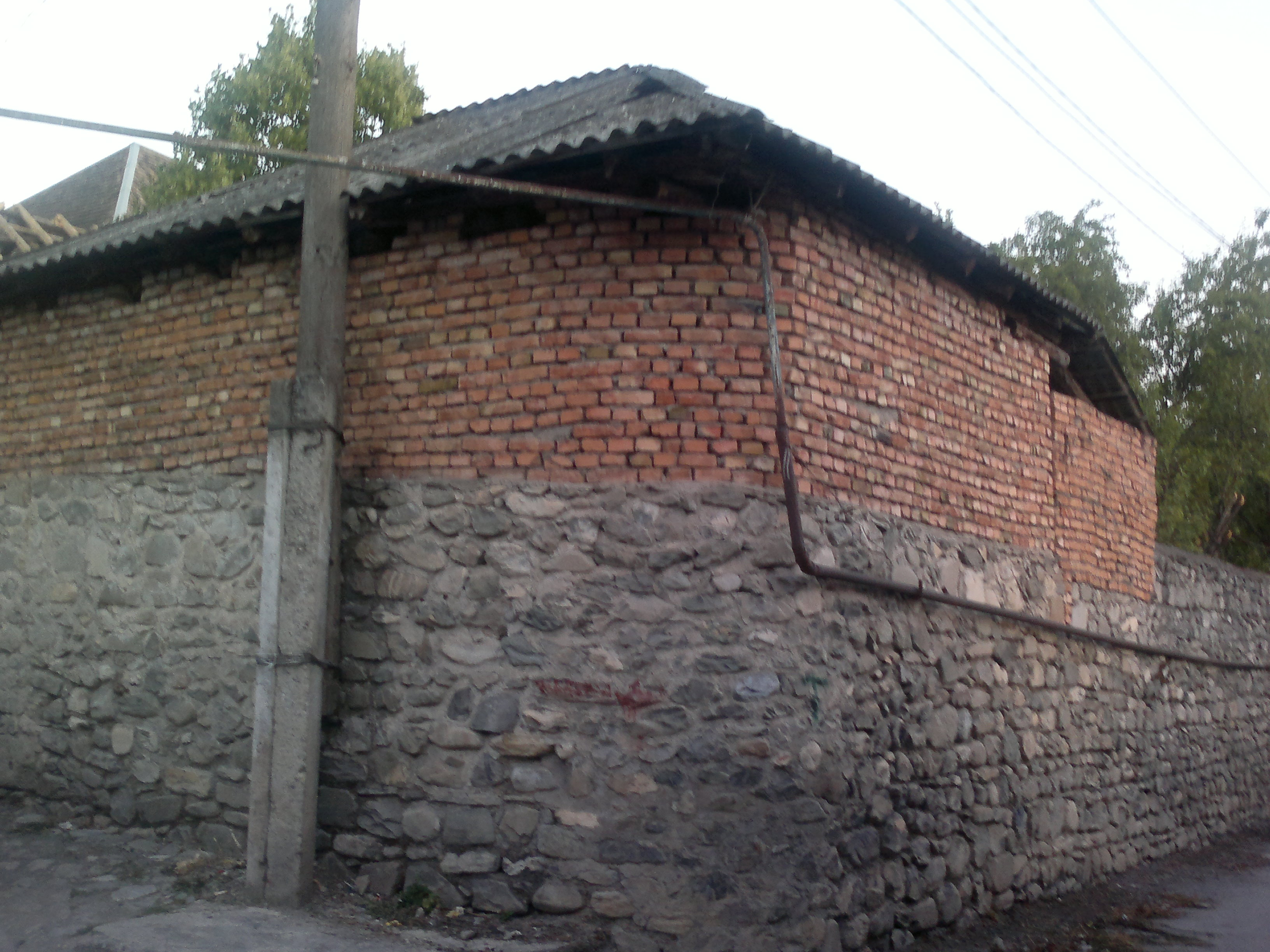

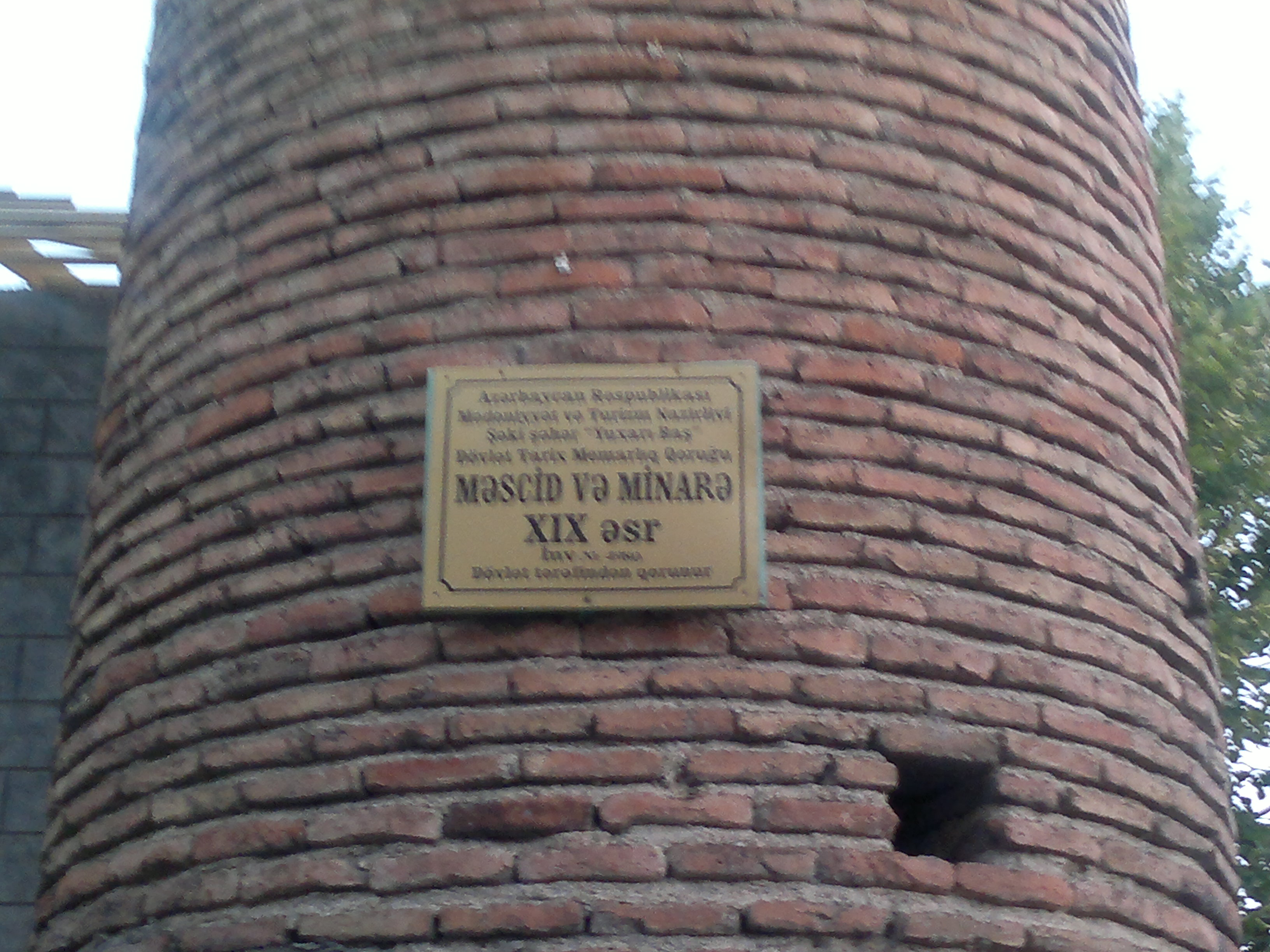

== See also ==
- Islam in Azerbaijan
- List of mosques in Azerbaijan
