= Tarikuiyeh =

Tarikuiyeh تاريكوييه
- Village
- Location within Iran
- Coordinates: 29°12′44″N 57°21′10″E
- Country: Iran
- Province: Kerman
- County: Jiroft
- Bakhsh: Sarduiyeh
- Rural District: Sarduiyeh

Population (2006)
  - Total: 41
- Time zone: UTC+3:30 (IRST)
  - Summer (DST): UTC+4:30 (IRDT)

Tarikuiyeh (Persian: تاريكوييه, also Romanized as Tārīkū’īyeh; also known as Bīd-e Shīrīn and Tārīkū) is a village in Sarduiyeh Rural District, Sarduiyeh District, Jiroft County, Kerman Province, Iran. At the 2006 census, its population was 41, in 6 families.
