= Rabor District =

Former district in Kerman province, Iran

Rabor District Persian: بخش رابر
- Former District
- Location within Iran
- Coordinates: 29°12′N 57°01′E
- Country: Iran
- Province: Kerman
- County: Baft
- Capital: Rabor

Population (2006)
  - Total: 33,718
- Time zone: UTC+3:30 (IRST)

Rabor District (Persian: بخش رابر) is a former administrative division of Baft County, Kerman province, Iran. Its capital was the city of Rabor.

== History ==
After the 2006 National Census, the district was separated from the county in the establishment of Rabor County.

== Demographics ==
=== Population ===
At the time of the 2006 census, the district's population was 33,718 in 7,664 households.

=== Administrative divisions ===
Rabor District Population
Administrative Divisions	2006
Hanza RD	6,193
Javaran RD	5,068
Rabor RD	4,562
Siyahbanuiyeh RD	5,509
Rabor (city)	4,562
Total	33,718
RD = Rural District
