= Siyahbanuiyeh Rural District =

Rural district in Kerman province, Iran

Siyahbanuiyeh Rural District Persian: دهستان سیه‌بنوئیه
- Rural District
- Location within Iran
- Coordinates: 29°23′20″N 56°57′20″E
- Country: Iran
- Province: Kerman
- County: Rabor
- District: Central
- Capital: Siyah Banuiyeh

Population (2016)
  - Total: 5,751
- Time zone: UTC+3:30 (IRST)

Siyahbanuiyeh Rural District (Persian: دهستان سیه‌بنوئیه) is in the Central District of Rabor County, Kerman province, Iran. Its capital is the village of Siyah Banuiyeh.

== Demographics ==
=== Population ===
At the time of the 2006 National Census, the rural district's population (as a part of the former Rabor District of Baft County) was 5,509 in 1,305 households. There were 5,412 inhabitants in 1,633 households at the following census of 2011, by which time the district had been separated from the county in the establishment of Rabor County. The rural district was transferred to the new Central District. The 2016 census measured the population of the rural district as 5,751 in 1,891 households. The most populous of its 69 villages was Siyah Banuiyeh, with 2,060 people.
