= Rabor Rural District =

Rural district in Kerman province, Iran

Rabor Rural District Persian: دهستان رابر
- Rural District
- Location within Iran
- Coordinates: 29°16′41″N 56°51′23″E
- Country: Iran
- Province: Kerman
- County: Rabor
- District: Central
- Capital: Esker

Population (2016)
  - Total: 4,526
- Time zone: UTC+3:30 (IRST)

Rabor Rural District (Persian: دهستان رابر) is in the Central District of Rabor County, Kerman province, Iran. Its capital is the village of Esker.

== Demographics ==
=== Population ===
At the time of the 2006 National Census, the rural district's population (as a part of the former Rabor District of Baft County) was 4,562 in 1,084 households. There were 4,157 inhabitants in 1,398 households at the following census of 2011, by which time the district had been separated from the county in the establishment of Rabor County. The rural district was transferred to the new Central District. The 2016 census measured the population of the rural district as 4,526 in 1,554 households. The most populous of its 62 villages was Esker, with 1,734 people.
