= Javaran Rural District =

Rural district in Kerman province, Iran

Javaran Rural District Persian: دهستان جواران
- Rural District
- Location within Iran
- Coordinates: 29°07′36″N 56°58′17″E
- Country: Iran
- Province: Kerman
- County: Rabor
- District: Hanza
- Capital: Kahnuj

Population (2016)
  - Total: 5,403
- Time zone: UTC+3:30 (IRST)

Javaran Rural District (Persian: دهستان جواران) is in Hanza District of Rabor County, Kerman province, Iran. Its capital is the village of Kahnuj.

== Demographics ==
=== Population ===
At the time of the 2006 National Census, the rural district's population (as a part of the former Rabor District of Baft County) was 5,068 in 1,218 households. There were 5,747 inhabitants in 1,587 households at the following census of 2011, by which time the district had been separated from the county in the establishment of Rabor County. The rural district was transferred to the new Hanza District. The 2016 census measured the population of the rural district as 5,403 in 1,925 households. The most populous of its 109 villages was Javaran, with 652 people.
