= Central District (Rabor County) =

District in Kerman province, Iran

Central District (Rabor County) Persian: بخش مرکزی شهرستان رابر
- District
- Location within Iran
- Coordinates: 29°18′37″N 56°55′34″E
- Country: Iran
- Province: Kerman
- County: Rabor
- Capital: Rabor

Population (2016)
  - Total: 23,540
- Time zone: UTC+3:30 (IRST)

The Central District of Rabor County (Persian: بخش مرکزی شهرستان رابر) is in Kerman province, Iran. Its capital is the city of Rabor.

== History ==
After the 2006 National Census, Rabor District was separated from Baft County in the establishment of Rabor County, which was divided into two districts of two rural districts each, with Rabor as its capital and only city at the time.

== Demographics ==
=== Population ===
At the time of the 2011 census, the district's population was 21,226 people in 6,047 households. The 2016 census measured the population of the district as 23,540 inhabitants in 7,496 households.

=== Administrative divisions ===
Central District (Rabor County) Population
Administrative Divisions	2011	2016
Rabor RD	4,157	4,526
Siyahbanuiyeh RD	5,412	5,751
Rabor (city)	11,657	13,263
Total	21,226	23,540
RD = Rural District
