= Hanza Rural District =

Rural district in Kerman province, Iran

Hanza Rural District Persian: دهستان هنزا
- Rural District
- Location within Iran
- Coordinates: 29°15′04″N 57°06′19″E
- Country: Iran
- Province: Kerman
- County: Rabor
- District: Hanza
- Capital: Hanza

Population (2016)
  - Total: 4,851
- Time zone: UTC+3:30 (IRST)

Hanza Rural District (Persian: دهستان هنزا) is in Hanza District of Rabor County, Kerman province, Iran. It is administered from the city of Hanza.

== Demographics ==
=== Population ===
At the time of the 2006 National Census, the rural district's population (as a part of the former Rabor District of Baft County) was 6,193 in 1,323 households. There were 6,889 inhabitants in 2,044 households at the following census of 2011, by which time the district had been separated from the county in the establishment of Rabor County. The rural district was transferred to the new Hanza District. The 2016 census measured the population of the rural district as 4,851 in 1,597 households. The most populous of its 109 villages was Kangari, with 415 people.
