= Hanza District =

District in Kerman province, Iran

Hanza District Persian: بخش هنزا
- District
- Location within Iran
- Coordinates: 29°09′37″N 57°05′06″E
- Country: Iran
- Province: Kerman
- County: Rabor
- Capital: Hanza

Population (2016)
  - Total: 11,706
- Time zone: UTC+3:30 (IRST)

Hanza District (Persian: بخش هنزا) is in Rabor County, Kerman province, Iran. Its capital is the city of Hanza.

== History ==
After the 2006 National Census, Rabor District was separated from Baft County in the establishment of Rabor County, which was divided into two districts of two rural districts each, with Rabor as its capital and only city at the time. After the 2011 census, the village of Hanza was elevated to the status of a city.

== Demographics ==
=== Population ===
At the time of the 2011 census, the district's population was 12,636 people in 3,631 households. The 2016 census measured the population of the district as 11,706 inhabitants in 3,982 households.

=== Administrative divisions ===
Hanza District Population
Administrative Divisions	2011	2016
Hanza RD	6,889	4,851
Javaran RD	5,747	5,403
Hanza (city)		1,452
Total	12,636	11,706
RD = Rural District
