= Rabor County =

County in Kerman province, Iran

Rabor County Persian: شهرستان رابر
- County
- Location of Rabor County in Kerman province (center left, purple)

- Location of Kerman province in Iran
- Coordinates: 29°12′N 57°01′E
- Country: Iran
- Province: Kerman
- Capital: Rabor
- Districts: Central, Hanza

Population (2016)
  - Total: 35,362
- Time zone: UTC+3:30 (IRST)

Rabor County (Persian: شهرستان رابر) is in Kerman province, Iran. Its capital is the city of Rabor.

== History ==
After the 2006 National Census, Rabor District was separated from Baft County in the establishment of Rabor County, which was divided into two districts of two rural districts each, with Rabor as its capital and only city at the time. After the 2011 census, the village of Hanza was elevated to the status of a city.

== Demographics ==
=== Population ===
At the time of the 2011 census, the county's population was 34,392 people in 9,818 households. The 2016 census measured the population of the county as 35,362 in 11,513 households.

=== Administrative divisions ===
Rabor County's population history and administrative structure over two consecutive censuses are shown in the following table.

Rabor County Population
Administrative Divisions	2011	2016
Central District	21,226	23,540
Rabor RD	4,157	4,526
Siyahbanuiyeh RD	5,412	5,751
Rabor (city)	11,657	13,263
Hanza District	12,636	11,706
Hanza RD	6,889	4,851
Javaran RD	5,747	5,403
Hanza (city)		1,452
Total	34,392	35,362
RD = Rural District

== See also ==
Media related to Rabor County at Wikimedia Commons
