= Deh Sheykh =

Deh Sheykh or Deh-e Sheykh or Deh Shaikh or Deh Sheikh or Deh-i-Shaikh or Dehsheykh (Persian: ده شيخ) may refer to:

- Deh Sheykh, Lamerd, Fars province
- Deh Sheykh, Shiraz, Fars province
- Deh-e Sheykh, Arzuiyeh, Kerman province
- Deh-e Sheykh, alternate name of Deh-e Sheykh Soltan Abdollah, Jiroft County, Kerman province
- Dehsheykh, alternate name of Deh Sheykh Morghazi, Jiroft County, Kerman province
- Deh-e Sheykh 2, Kerman province
- Deh Sheykh, Sirjan, Kerman province
- Deh-e Sheykh, Mohammadabad, Zarand County, Kerman province
- Deh-e Sheykh, Sarbanan, Zarand County, Kerman province
- Deh-e Sheykh, Salas-e Babajani, Kermanshah province
- Deh-e Sheykh, Sonqor, Kermanshah province
- Deh-e Sheykh, Khuzestan
- Deh-e Sheykh Dilgun, Kohgiluyeh and Boyer-Ahmad province
- Deh Sheykh-e Pataveh, Kohgiluyeh and Boyer-Ahmad province
- Deh Sheykh-e Tasuj, Kohgiluyeh and Boyer-Ahmad province
- Deh Sheykh, Razavi Khorasan
- Deh Sheykh, South Khorasan
