= Murd =

Murd or Mowrd (Persian: مورد) may refer to:

- Murd-e Susani, Fars Province
- Murd, Hormozgan
- Murd, Andika, Khuzestan Province
- Murd, Bagh-e Malek, Khuzestan Province
- Murd, Izeh, Khuzestan Province
- Murd-e Ghaffar, Khuzestan Province
- Murd-e Sadat, Khuzestan Province
- Murd, Lali, Khuzestan Province
- Mowrd, Kohgiluyeh and Boyer-Ahmad
- Murd, Bahmai, Kohgiluyeh and Boyer-Ahmad Province
- Murd, Boyer-Ahmad, Kohgiluyeh and Boyer-Ahmad Province
- Murd Risheh, Kohgiluyeh and Boyer-Ahmad Province
- Murd-e Seyyed Gambuli, Kohgiluyeh and Boyer-Ahmad Province

== See also ==
- Deh Murd
