= Jangalabad =

Jangalabad (Persian: جنگل اباد) may refer to:

- Jangalabad, Anbarabad
- Jangalabad-e Bala, Jiroft County
- Jangalabad-e Pain, Jiroft County
- Jangalabad, Manujan
- Jangalabad, Qaleh Ganj
- Jangalabad, Rabor
- Jangalabad, Rigan
