= Kalab =

Kalab (Persian: كلاب) may refer to:

- Kalab, Gilan
- Kalab-e Ahmad, Kohgiluyeh and Boyer-Ahmad Province
- Kalab-e Olya, Kohgiluyeh and Boyer-Ahmad Province
- Kalab-e Sofla, Kohgiluyeh and Boyer-Ahmad Province
- Kalab-e Vosta, Kohgiluyeh and Boyer-Ahmad Province
- Kalab, North Khorasan
- Kalab-e Sufian (disambiguation)
