= Gazabad =

Gazabad (Persian: گزاباد) may refer to:

- Gazabad, Anbarabad, Kerman Province
- Gazabad, Dowlatabad, Jiroft County, Kerman Province
- Gazabad, Khatunabad, Jiroft County, Kerman Province
- Gazabad, Qaleh Ganj, Kerman Province
- Gazabad-e Manuchehri, Kerman Province
- Gazabad-e Yek, Kerman Province
- Gazabad, North Khorasan
- Gazabad, Qom
