= Mohammadabad-e Do, Jiroft =

Village in Kerman province, Iran

Mohammadabad-e Do Persian: محمد آباد2
- Village
- Location within Iran
- Coordinates: 28°47′03″N 57°10′37″E
- Country: Iran
- Province: Kerman
- County: Jiroft
- District: Esfandaqeh
- Rural District: Esfandaqeh

Population (2016)
  - Total: 78
- Time zone: UTC+3:30 (IRST)

Mohammadabad-e Do (Persian: محمد آباد2) (Note: Also romanized as Moḩammadābād-e Do; also known as Moḩammadābād, Moḩammadābād-e Sārdū’īyeh, and Mohammad Abad Sardoo’iyeh) is a village in Esfandaqeh Rural District of Esfandaqeh District, Jiroft County, Kerman province, Iran.

== Demographics ==
=== Population ===
At the time of the 2006 National Census, the village's population was 73 in 19 households, when it was in the Central District. The following census in 2011 counted 96 people in 28 households. The 2016 census measured the population of the village as 78 people in 24 households.

In 2017, the rural district was separated from the district in the establishment of Esfandaqeh District.
