= Ferdows (disambiguation) =

Ferdows is a city in South Khorasan Province in Iran

Ferdows (Persian: فردوس) may also refer to:

- Firdaus, another name for the concept of Jannah (paradise) in Islam
- Firdous e Bareen, a supposed paradise garden of the Order of Assassins in Alamut, Iran
  - Firdaus-e-Bareen, a 1899 novel by Indian writer Abdul Halim Sharar
- Ferdows, Jiroft, a village in Kerman Province, Iran
- Ferdows, Narmashir, a village in Kerman Province, Iran
- Ferdows, Rigan, a village in Kerman Province, Iran
- Ferdows, Razavi Khorasan, a village in Razavi Khorasan province in Iran
- Ferdows County, a county in South Khorasan province in Iran
- Ferdowsieh, formerly Ferdows, a city near Tehran, Iran
- Ferdows Boulevard, a boulevard in the west of Tehran, Iran
- Bagh-e Ferdows, a historical complex of garden palaces in Tajrish, Iran
- Ferdows Rural District (disambiguation), administrative subdivisions of Iran

== See also ==
- Ferdowsi (disambiguation)
- Ferdowsiyeh (disambiguation)
