= Kuh Nimeh =

Kuh Nimeh كوه نيمه
- Village
- Location within Iran
- Coordinates: 28°52′54″N 57°37′12″E
- Country: Iran
- Province: Kerman
- County: Jiroft
- Bakhsh: Central
- Rural District: Halil

Population (2006)
  - Total: 210
- Time zone: UTC+3:30 (IRST)
  - Summer (DST): UTC+4:30 (IRDT)

Kuh Nimeh (Persian: كوه نيمه, also Romanized as Kūh Nīmeh, Kooh Nimeh, and Kūh-e Nīmeh; also known as Kūnemeng) is a village in Halil Rural District, in the Central District of Jiroft County, Kerman Province, Iran. At the 2006 census, its population was 210, in 46 families.
