= Ferdows, Jiroft =

Village in Kerman province, Iran

Ferdows Persian: فردوس
- Village
- Location within Iran
- Coordinates: 28°41′01″N 57°09′41″E
- Country: Iran
- Province: Kerman
- County: Jiroft
- District: Esfandaqeh
- Rural District: Ferdows

Population (2016)
  - Total: 881
- Time zone: UTC+3:30 (IRST)

Ferdows (Persian: فردوس) is a village in, and the capital of, Ferdows Rural District of Esfandaqeh District, Jiroft County, Kerman province, Iran.

== Demographics ==
=== Population ===
At the time of the 2006 National Census, the village's population was 592 in 161 households, when it was in Esfandaqeh Rural District of the Central District). The following census in 2011 counted 830 people in 231 households. The 2016 census measured the population of the village as 881 people in 262 households.

In 2017, the rural district was separated from the district in the establishment of Esfandaqeh District, and Ferdows was transferred to Ferdows Rural District created in the new district.
