= Gudazran =

Gudazran گودزران
- Village
- Location within Iran
- Coordinates: 28°45′04″N 57°02′27″E
- Country: Iran
- Province: Kerman
- County: Jiroft
- Bakhsh: Central
- Rural District: Esfandaqeh

Population (2006)
  - Total: 87
- Time zone: UTC+3:30 (IRST)
  - Summer (DST): UTC+4:30 (IRDT)

Gudazran (Persian: گودزران, also Romanized as Gūdazrān; also known as Gūdarzān) is a village in Esfandaqeh Rural District, in the Central District of Jiroft County, Kerman Province, Iran. At the 2006 census, its population was 87, in 20 families.
