= Sargaz =

Sargaz or Sar-e Gaz or Sar Gaz (Persian: سرگز) may refer to:

- Sar Gaz, Esfandaqeh, Kerman Province
- Sar Gaz-e Pain, Kerman Province
- Sar Gaz, South Khorasan
- Sar-e Gaz-e Ahmadi
- Sargaz-e Khazor Safakalinu
