= Mar Mord =

Mar Mord مارمرد
- Village
- Location within Iran
- Coordinates: 28°36′57″N 57°40′52″E
- Country: Iran
- Province: Kerman
- County: Jiroft
- Bakhsh: Central
- Rural District: Khatunabad

Population (2006)
  - Total: 81
- Time zone: UTC+3:30 (IRST)
  - Summer (DST): UTC+4:30 (IRDT)

Mar Mord (Persian: مارمرد, also Romanized as Mār Mord and Mār Mard) is a village in Khatunabad Rural District, in the Central District of Jiroft County, Kerman Province, Iran. At the 2006 census, its population was 81, in 20 families.
