= Abbasabad, Dowlatabad =

Neighborhood in Kerman province, Iran

Abbasabad Persian: عباس اباد
- Neighborhood
- Location within Iran
- Coordinates: 28°33′30″N 57°50′49″E
- Country: Iran
- Province: Kerman
- County: Jiroft
- District: Central
- City: Aliabad-e Omran

Population (2016)
  - Total: Below reporting threshold
- Time zone: UTC+3:30 (IRST)

Abbasabad (Persian: عباس اباد) (Note: Also Romanized as ‘Abbāsābād) is a neighborhood in the city of Aliabad-e Omran in the Central District of Jiroft County, Kerman province, Iran.

== Demographics ==
=== Population ===
At the time of the 2006 National Census, Abbasabad's population was 440 in 101 households, when it was a village in Dowlatabad Rural District. The following censuses of 2011 and 2016 showed a population below the reporting threshold.

After the census, the village of Aliabad merged with Abbasabad and was elevated to city status as Aliabad-e Omran.
