= Tom Gavan =

Tom Gavan تمگاوان
- Village
- Location within Iran
- Coordinates: 28°39′41″N 57°47′50″E
- Country: Iran
- Province: Kerman
- County: Jiroft
- Bakhsh: Central
- Rural District: Dowlatabad

Population (2006)
  - Total: 355
- Time zone: UTC+3:30 (IRST)
  - Summer (DST): UTC+4:30 (IRDT)

Tom Gavan (Persian: تمگاوان, also Romanized as Tom Gāvān; also known as Dom Gāvān and S̄om Gāvān) is a village in Dowlatabad Rural District, in the Central District of Jiroft County, Kerman Province, Iran. At the 2006 census, its population was 355, in 80 families.
