= Deh Gazi =

Deh Gazi ده گزي
- Village
- Country: Iran
- Province: Kerman
- County: Jiroft
- Bakhsh: Central
- Rural District: Khatunabad

Population (2006)
  - Total: 64
- Time zone: UTC+3:30 (IRST)
  - Summer (DST): UTC+4:30 (IRDT)

Deh Gazi (Persian: ده گزي, also Romanized as Deh Gazī) is a village in Khatunabad Rural District, in the Central District of Jiroft County, Kerman Province, Iran. As of the 2006 census, its population was 64, in 15 families.
