= Zarjuiyeh =

Zarjuiyeh زارجوئيه
- Village
- Country: Iran
- Province: Kerman
- County: Jiroft
- Bakhsh: Central
- Rural District: Esfandaqeh

Population (2006)
  - Total: 18
- Time zone: UTC+3:30 (IRST)
  - Summer (DST): UTC+4:30 (IRDT)

Zarjuiyeh (Persian: زارجوئيه, also Romanized as Zārjū’īyeh) is a village in Esfandaqeh Rural District, in the Central District of Jiroft County, Kerman Province, Iran. At the 2006 census, its population was 18, in 5 families.
