= Charusa =

Charusa may refer to:

- Charusa District, an administrative subdivision of Iran
- Qaleh Raisi, a city in Iran, capital of the above
