= Deh Sheykh Morghazi =

Deh Sheykh Morghazi ده شيخ مرغزي
- Village
- Location within Iran
- Coordinates: 28°40′08″N 57°48′35″E
- Country: Iran
- Province: Kerman
- County: Jiroft
- Bakhsh: Central
- Rural District: Khatunabad

Population (2006)
  - Total: 646
- Time zone: UTC+3:30 (IRST)
  - Summer (DST): UTC+4:30 (IRDT)

Deh Sheykh Morghazi (Persian: ده شيخ مرغزي, also Romanized as Deh Sheykh Morghazī; also known as Dehsheykh) is a village in Khatunabad Rural District, in the Central District of Jiroft County, Kerman Province, Iran. At the 2006 census, its population was 646, in 142 families.
