= Ayneh Bazar-e Mahtab =

Ayneh Bazar-e Mahtab اينه بازارمهتاب
- Village
- Location within Iran
- Coordinates: 31°11′52″N 50°38′47″E
- Country: Iran
- Province: Kohgiluyeh and Boyer-Ahmad
- County: Kohgiluyeh
- Bakhsh: Charusa
- Rural District: Tayebi-ye Sarhadi-ye Sharqi

Population (2006)
  - Total: 56
- Time zone: UTC+3:30 (IRST)
  - Summer (DST): UTC+4:30 (IRDT)

Ayneh Bazar-e Mahtab (Persian: اينه بازارمهتاب, also Romanized as Ayneh Bāzār-e Mahtāb; also known as Aeenehbāzār-e Mahtāb) is a village in Tayebi-ye Sarhadi-ye Sharqi Rural District, Charusa District, Kohgiluyeh County, Kohgiluyeh and Boyer-Ahmad Province, Iran. At the 2006 census, its population was 56, in 9 families.
