= Ferdowsiyeh =

Ferdowsiyeh (Persian: فردوسيه) may refer to several places in Iran:

- Ferdowsiyeh, Azadegan, Rafsanjan County, Kerman Province
- Ferdowsiyeh, Narmashir, Kerman Province
- Ferdowsiyeh, Rafsanjan, Kerman Province
- Ferdowsiyeh, Shahriar, Tehran Province
- Ferdowsiyeh, Yazd

== See also ==
- Ferdowsi (disambiguation)
- Ferdows (disambiguation)
