= Dowlatabad, Esfandaqeh =

Village in Kerman province, Iran

Dowlatabad Persian: دولتاباد
- Village
- Location within Iran
- Coordinates: 28°42′58″N 57°08′42″E
- Country: Iran
- Province: Kerman
- County: Jiroft
- District: Esfandaqeh
- Rural District: Esfandaqeh

Population (2016)
  - Total: 4,930
- Time zone: UTC+3:30 (IRST)

Dowlatabad (Persian: دولتاباد) (Note: Also romanized as Dowlatābād; also known as Daulasābād and Dowlatābād-e Esfandaqeh) is a village in Esfandaqeh Rural District of Esfandaqeh District, Jiroft County, Kerman province, Iran, serving as capital of both the district and the rural district.

== Demographics ==
=== Population ===
At the time of the 2006 National Census, the village's population was 2,200 in 460 households, when it was in the Central District. The following census in 2011 counted 5,534 people in 1,283 households. The 2016 census measured the population of the village as 4,930 people in 1,387 households. It was the most populous village in its rural district.

In 2017, the rural district was separated from the district in the establishment of Esfandaqeh District.
