= Hukerd =

Hukerd هوكرد
- Village
- Location within Iran
- Coordinates: 28°37′29″N 57°43′41″E
- Country: Iran
- Province: Kerman
- County: Jiroft
- Bakhsh: Central
- Rural District: Khatunabad

Population (2006)
  - Total: 1,833
- Time zone: UTC+3:30 (IRST)
  - Summer (DST): UTC+4:30 (IRDT)

Hukerd (Persian: هوكرد, also Romanized as Hūkerd and Hookerd; also known as Hījerd-e Bālā, Hījerd-e Pā’īn, Hūjerd, and Hūke) is a village in Khatunabad Rural District, in the Central District of Jiroft County, Kerman Province, Iran. At the 2006 census, its population was 1,833, in 420 families.
