= Dowlatabad, Jiroft =

Village in Kerman province, Iran

Dowlatabad Persian: دولت اباد
- Village
- Location within Iran
- Coordinates: 28°36′06″N 57°48′28″E
- Country: Iran
- Province: Kerman
- County: Jiroft
- District: Central
- Rural District: Dowlatabad

Population (2016)
  - Total: 4,196
- Time zone: UTC+3:30 (IRST)

Dowlatabad (Persian: دولت اباد) (Note: Also romanized as Dowlatābād; also known as Daulatābād) is a village in, and the capital of, Dowlatabad Rural District of the Central District of Jiroft County, Kerman province, Iran.

== Demographics ==
=== Population ===
At the time of the 2006 National Census, the village's population was 1,797 in 366 households. The following census in 2011 counted 4,492 people in 1,013 households. The 2016 census measured the population of the village as 4,196 people in 954 households.
