= Khatunabad, Jiroft =

Village in Kerman province, Iran

Khatunabad Persian: خاتون اباد
- Village
- Location within Iran
- Coordinates: 28°35′36″N 57°42′43″E
- Country: Iran
- Province: Kerman
- County: Jiroft
- District: Central
- Rural District: Khatunabad

Population (2016)
  - Total: 1,519
- Time zone: UTC+3:30 (IRST)

Khatunabad (Persian: خاتون اباد) (Note: Also romanized as Khātūnābād) is a village in, and the capital of, Khatunabad Rural District of the Central District of Jiroft County, Kerman province, Iran.

== Demographics ==
=== Population ===
At the time of the 2006 National Census, the village's population was 788 in 171 households. The following census in 2011 counted 1,090 people in 286 households. The 2016 census measured the population of the village as 1,519 people in 399 households.
