= Deh-e Nar, Kohgiluyeh and Boyer-Ahmad =

Deh-e Nar ده نار
- Village
- Location within Iran
- Coordinates: 31°07′54″N 50°32′41″E
- Country: Iran
- Province: Kohgiluyeh and Boyer-Ahmad
- County: Kohgiluyeh
- Bakhsh: Charusa
- Rural District: Tayebi-ye Sarhadi-ye Sharqi

Population (2006)
  - Total: 168
- Time zone: UTC+3:30 (IRST)
  - Summer (DST): UTC+4:30 (IRDT)

Deh-e Nar (Persian: ده نار, also Romanized as Deh-e Nār; also known as Deh-e Anār) is a village in Tayebi-ye Sarhadi-ye Sharqi Rural District, Charusa District, Kohgiluyeh County, Kohgiluyeh and Boyer-Ahmad Province, Iran. At the 2006 census, its population was 168, in 25 families.
