= Dasht-e Kuch-e Bala =

Dasht-e Kuch-e Bala دشت كوچ بالا
- Village
- Location within Iran
- Coordinates: 28°41′32″N 57°49′29″E
- Country: Iran
- Province: Kerman
- County: Jiroft
- Bakhsh: Central
- Rural District: Dowlatabad

Population (2006)
  - Total: 337
- Time zone: UTC+3:30 (IRST)
  - Summer (DST): UTC+4:30 (IRDT)

Dasht-e Kuch-e Bala (Persian: دشت كوچ بالا, also Romanized as Dasht-e Kūch-e Bālā; also known as Dasht-e Kūch, Dasht-i-Kūch, Dasht Kooch, and Dasht Kūch) is a village in Dowlatabad Rural District, in the Central District of Jiroft County, Kerman Province, Iran. At the 2006 census, its population was 337, in 90 families.
