= Sar Gaz-e Pain =

Sar Gaz-e Pain سرگزپائين
- Village
- Country: Iran
- Province: Kerman
- County: Jiroft
- Bakhsh: Central
- Rural District: Esfandaqeh

Population (2006)
  - Total: 17
- Time zone: UTC+3:30 (IRST)
  - Summer (DST): UTC+4:30 (IRDT)

Sar Gaz-e Pain (Persian: سرگزپائين, also Romanized as Sar Gaz-e Pā’īn) is a village in Esfandaqeh Rural District, in the Central District of Jiroft County, Kerman Province, Iran. At the 2006 census, its population was 17, in 5 families.
