= Heridun-e Zirkal =

Heridun-e Zirkal هريدون زيركل
- Village
- Location within Iran
- Coordinates: 31°04′30″N 50°32′07″E
- Country: Iran
- Province: Kohgiluyeh and Boyer-Ahmad
- County: Kohgiluyeh
- Bakhsh: Charusa
- Rural District: Tayebi-ye Sarhadi-ye Sharqi

Population (2006)
  - Total: 30
- Time zone: UTC+3:30 (IRST)
  - Summer (DST): UTC+4:30 (IRDT)

Heridun-e Zirkal (Persian: هريدون زيركل, also Romanized as Herīdūn-e Zīrkal; also known as Herīdūn) is a village in Tayebi-ye Sarhadi-ye Sharqi Rural District, Charusa District, Kohgiluyeh County, Kohgiluyeh and Boyer-Ahmad Province, Iran. At the 2006 census, its population was 30, in 4 families.
