= Ab Nuk =

Ab Nuk اب نوك
- Village
- Location within Iran
- Coordinates: 31°11′55″N 50°28′53″E
- Country: Iran
- Province: Kohgiluyeh and Boyer-Ahmad
- County: Kohgiluyeh
- Bakhsh: Charusa
- Rural District: Tayebi-ye Sarhadi-ye Gharbi

Population (2006)
  - Total: 191
- Time zone: UTC+3:30 (IRST)
  - Summer (DST): UTC+4:30 (IRDT)

Ab Nuk (Persian: اب نوك, also Romanized as Āb Nūk; also known as Ābnūk) is a village in Tayebi-ye Sarhadi-ye Gharbi Rural District, Charusa District, Kohgiluyeh County, Kohgiluyeh and Boyer-Ahmad province, Iran. At the 2006 census, its population was 191, in 34 families.
