= Kahuruiyeh =

Neighborhood in Kerman province, Iran

Kahuruiyeh Persian: کهوروییه
- Neighborhood
- Location within Iran
- Coordinates: 28°39′50″N 57°43′25″E
- Country: Iran
- Province: Kerman
- County: Jiroft
- District: Central
- City: Jiroft
- Time zone: UTC+3:30 (IRST)

Kahuruiyeh (Persian: کهوروییه) is a neighborhood in the city of Jiroft in the Central District of Jiroft County, Kerman province, Iran. It was the capital of Halil Rural District before its merger with the city.
