= Bifah Zari =

Bifah Zari بيفه زاري
- Village
- Location within Iran
- Coordinates: 31°07′42″N 50°31′44″E
- Country: Iran
- Province: Kohgiluyeh and Boyer-Ahmad
- County: Kohgiluyeh
- Bakhsh: Charusa
- Rural District: Tayebi-ye Sarhadi-ye Sharqi

Population (2006)
  - Total: 58
- Time zone: UTC+3:30 (IRST)
  - Summer (DST): UTC+4:30 (IRDT)

Bifah Zari (Persian: بيفه زاري, also Romanized as Bīfah Zārī; also known as Būfah Zārī) is a village in Tayebi-ye Sarhadi-ye Sharqi Rural District, Charusa District, Kohgiluyeh County, Kohgiluyeh and Boyer-Ahmad Province, Iran. At the 2006 census, its population was 58, in 11 families.
