= Bamuni Dam Tang-e Divan-e Mahtab =

Bamuni Dam Tang-e Divan-e Mahtab بموني دم تنگ ديون مهتاب
- Village
- Country: Iran
- Province: Kohgiluyeh and Boyer-Ahmad
- County: Kohgiluyeh
- Bakhsh: Charusa
- Rural District: Tayebi-ye Sarhadi-ye Sharqi

Population (2006)
  - Total: 38
- Time zone: UTC+3:30 (IRST)
  - Summer (DST): UTC+4:30 (IRDT)

Bamuni Dam Tang-e Divan-e Mahtab (Persian: بموني دم تنگ ديون مهتاب, also Romanized as Bamūnī Dam Tang-e Dīvan-e Mahtāb) is a village in Tayebi-ye Sarhadi-ye Sharqi Rural District, Charusa District, Kohgiluyeh County, Kohgiluyeh and Boyer-Ahmad Province, Iran. At the 2006 census, its population was 38, in 6 families.
