= Behjerd-e Sofla =

Behjerd-e Sofla بهجرد سفلي
- Village
- Location within Iran
- Coordinates: 28°40′05″N 57°41′55″E
- Country: Iran
- Province: Kerman
- County: Jiroft
- Bakhsh: Central
- Rural District: Halil

Population (2006)
  - Total: 455
- Time zone: UTC+3:30 (IRST)
  - Summer (DST): UTC+4:30 (IRDT)

Behjerd-e Sofla (Persian: بهجرد سفلي, also Romanized as Behjerd-e Soflá; also known as Behjerd and Behjerd-e Pā’īn) is a village in Halil Rural District, in the Central District of Jiroft County, Kerman Province, Iran. At the 2006 census, its population was 455, in 102 families.
