= Ahmad-e Naseri =

Ahmad-e Naseri احمدناصري
- Village
- Location within Iran
- Coordinates: 31°09′42″N 50°34′05″E
- Country: Iran
- Province: Kohgiluyeh and Boyer-Ahmad
- County: Kohgiluyeh
- Bakhsh: Charusa
- Rural District: Tayebi-ye Sarhadi-ye Sharqi

Population (2006)
  - Total: 115
- Time zone: UTC+3:30 (IRST)
  - Summer (DST): UTC+4:30 (IRDT)

Ahmad-e Naseri (Persian: احمدناصري, also Romanized as Aḩmad-e Nāşerī; also known as Aḩmad-e Nāẕerī) is a village in Tayebi-ye Sarhadi-ye Sharqi Rural District, Charusa District, Kohgiluyeh County, Kohgiluyeh and Boyer-Ahmad Province, Iran. At the 2006 census, its population was 115, in 23 families.
