= Javardeh =

Javardeh or Javar Deh (Persian: جوارده or جاورده) may refer to:

- Javardeh, Gilan (جوارده - Javārdeh)
- Javardeh, Kohgiluyeh and Boyer-Ahmad (جاورده - Jāvardeh)
