= Jangalabad-e Bala =

Jangalabad-e Bala جنگل ابادبالا
- Village
- Location within Iran
- Coordinates: 28°37′30″N 57°47′33″E
- Country: Iran
- Province: Kerman
- County: Jiroft
- Bakhsh: Central
- Rural District: Dowlatabad

Population (2006)
  - Total: 227
- Time zone: UTC+3:30 (IRST)
  - Summer (DST): UTC+4:30 (IRDT)

Jangalabad-e Bala (Persian: جنگل ابادبالا, also romanized as Jangalābād-e Bālā; also known as Jangalābād) is a village in Dowlatabad Rural District, in the Central District of Jiroft County, Kerman Province, Iran. At the 2006 census, its population was 227, in 44 families.
