= Bontuf-e Mohamid-e Biseytun =

Bontuf-e Mohamid-e Biseytun بن طوف محميدبي سيتون
- Village
- Country: Iran
- Province: Kohgiluyeh and Boyer-Ahmad
- County: Kohgiluyeh
- Bakhsh: Charusa
- Rural District: Tayebi-ye Sarhadi-ye Gharbi

Population (2006)
  - Total: 27
- Time zone: UTC+3:30 (IRST)
  - Summer (DST): UTC+4:30 (IRDT)

Bontuf-e Mohamid-e Biseytun (Persian: بن طوف محميدبي سيتون, also Romanized as Bonṭūf-e Moḥamīd-e Bīseytūn) is a village in Tayebi-ye Sarhadi-ye Gharbi Rural District, Charusa District, Kohgiluyeh County, Kohgiluyeh and Boyer-Ahmad Province, Iran. At the 2006 census, its population was 27, in 8 families.
