= Dasht-e Azadi-ye Javardeh =

Dasht-e Azadi-ye Javardeh دشت ازادي جاورده
- Village
- Location within Iran
- Coordinates: 31°07′59″N 50°30′01″E
- Country: Iran
- Province: Kohgiluyeh and Boyer-Ahmad
- County: Kohgiluyeh
- Bakhsh: Charusa
- Rural District: Tayebi-ye Sarhadi-ye Sharqi

Population (2006)
  - Total: 670
- Time zone: UTC+3:30 (IRST)
  - Summer (DST): UTC+4:30 (IRDT)

Dasht-e Azadi-ye Javardeh (Persian: دشت ازادي جاورده, also Romanized as Dasht-e Āzādī-ye Jāvardeh; also known as Dast Āzādī) is a village in the Tayebi-ye Sarhadi-ye Sharqi Rural District, Charusa District, Kohgiluyeh County, Kohgiluyeh and Boyer-Ahmad Province, Iran. At the 2006 census, its population was 670, in 119 families.
