= Deh-e Sheykh Soltan Abdollah =

Deh-e Sheykh Soltan Abdollah ده شيخ سلطان عبداله
- Village
- Location within Iran
- Coordinates: 28°40′21″N 57°48′44″E
- Country: Iran
- Province: Kerman
- County: Jiroft
- Bakhsh: Central
- Rural District: Dowlatabad

Population (2006)
  - Total: 76
- Time zone: UTC+3:30 (IRST)
  - Summer (DST): UTC+4:30 (IRDT)

Deh-e Sheykh Soltan Abdollah (Persian: ده شيخ سلطان عبداله, also Romanized as Deh-e Sheykh Solṭān ʿAbdollah; also known as Deh-e Sheykh, Deh-i-Shaīkh, and Deh Sheykh) is a village in Dowlatabad Rural District, in the Central District of Jiroft County, Kerman Province, Iran. At the 2006 census, its population was 76, in 19 families.
