= Kalab-e Sufian-e Olya =

Village in Kerman, Iran

Kalab-e Sufian-e Olya كلاب صوفيان عليا
- Village
- Location within Iran
- Coordinates: 28°35′10″N 57°43′03″E
- Country: Iran
- Province: Kerman
- County: Jiroft
- Bakhsh: Central
- Rural District: Khatunabad

Population (2006)
  - Total: 487
- Time zone: UTC+3:30 (IRST)
  - Summer (DST): UTC+4:30 (IRDT)

Kalab-e Sufian-e Olya (Persian: كلاب صوفيان عليا, also Romanized as Kalāb-e Şūfīān-e ‘Olyā; also known as Kalāb-e ‘Olyā) is a village in Khatunabad Rural District, in the Central District of Jiroft County, Kerman Province, Iran. At the 2006 census, its population was 487, in 105 families.
