= Darreh Sureh =

Darreh Sureh دره سوره
- Village
- Location within Iran
- Coordinates: 31°13′16″N 50°29′39″E
- Country: Iran
- Province: Kohgiluyeh and Boyer-Ahmad
- County: Kohgiluyeh
- Bakhsh: Charusa
- Rural District: Tayebi-ye Sarhadi-ye Gharbi

Population (2006)
  - Total: 150
- Time zone: UTC+3:30 (IRST)
  - Summer (DST): UTC+4:30 (IRDT)

Darreh Sureh (Persian: دره سوره, also Romanized as Darreh Sūreh; also known as Darrehsūr) is a village in Tayebi-ye Sarhadi-ye Gharbi Rural District, Charusa District, Kohgiluyeh County, Kohgiluyeh and Boyer-Ahmad Province, Iran. At the 2006 census, its population was 150, in 25 families.
