= Behjerd =

Behjerd (Persian: بهجرد) may refer to:

- Behjerd-e Bala
- Behjerd-e Sofla
