= Dasht-e Kuch =

Dasht-e Kuch or Dasht-i-Kuch or Dasht Kooch or Dasht Kuch (Persian: دشت كوچ) may refer to:

- Dasht-e Kuch-e Bala
- Dasht-e Kuch-e Pain
