= Deh Emamzadeh-ye Biseytun =

Deh Emamzadeh-ye Biseytun ده امامزاده بي سيتون
- Village
- Country: Iran
- Province: Kohgiluyeh and Boyer-Ahmad
- County: Kohgiluyeh
- Bakhsh: Charusa
- Rural District: Tayebi-ye Sarhadi-ye Gharbi

Population (2006)
  - Total: 422
- Time zone: UTC+3:30 (IRST)
  - Summer (DST): UTC+4:30 (IRDT)

Deh Emamzadeh-ye Biseytun (Persian: ده امامزاده بي سيتون, also Romanized as Deh Emāmzādeh-ye Bīseytūn) is a village in Tayebi-ye Sarhadi-ye Gharbi Rural District, Charusa District, Kohgiluyeh County, Kohgiluyeh and Boyer-Ahmad Province, Iran. At the 2006 census, its population was 422, in 83 families.
