= Shahr Kheybonari-ye Fathi =

Shahr Kheybonari-ye Fathi شهرخي بناري فتحي
- Village
- Country: Iran
- Province: Kohgiluyeh and Boyer-Ahmad
- County: Kohgiluyeh
- Bakhsh: Charusa
- Rural District: Tayebi-ye Sarhadi-ye Gharbi

Population (2006)
  - Total: 48
- Time zone: UTC+3:30 (IRST)
  - Summer (DST): UTC+4:30 (IRDT)

Shahr Kheybonari-ye Fathi (Persian: شهرخي بناري فتحي, also Romanized as Shahr Kheybonārī-ye Fatḥī) is a village in Tayebi-ye Sarhadi-ye Gharbi Rural District, Charusa District, Kohgiluyeh County, Kohgiluyeh and Boyer-Ahmad Province, Iran. At the 2006 census, its population was 48, in 9 families.
