= Bard Rasun =

Bard Rasun (Persian: بردراسون) may refer to:

- Bard Rasun-e Olya
- Bard Rasun-e Sofla
