= Gazabad, Dowlatabad =

Gazabad گزاباد
- Village
- Location within Iran
- Coordinates: 28°38′34″N 57°47′23″E
- Country: Iran
- Province: Kerman
- County: Jiroft
- Bakhsh: Central
- Rural District: Dowlatabad

Population (2006)
  - Total: 114
- Time zone: UTC+3:30 (IRST)
  - Summer (DST): UTC+4:30 (IRDT)

Gazabad (Persian: گزاباد, also Romanized as Gazābād) is a village in Dowlatabad Rural District, in the Central District of Jiroft County, Kerman Province, Iran. At the 2006 census, its population was 114, in 24 families.
