= Poshtlor =

Village in Kerman province, Iran

Poshtlor Persian: پشتلر
- Village
- Location within Iran
- Coordinates: 28°37′42″N 57°44′46″E
- Country: Iran
- Province: Kerman
- County: Jiroft
- District: Central
- Rural District: Halil

Population (2016)
  - Total: 1,552
- Time zone: UTC+3:30 (IRST)

Poshtlor (Persian: پشتلر) (Note: Also romanized as Posht Lor and Posht-e Lor) is a village in Halil Rural District of the Central District of Jiroft County, Kerman province, Iran.

== Demographics ==
=== Population ===
At the time of the 2006 National Census, the village's population was 992 in 235 households. The following census in 2011 counted 1,367 people in 399 households. The 2016 census measured the population of the village as 1,552 people in 450 households. It was the most populous village in its rural district.
