= Behjerd-e Bala =

Behjerd-e Bala بهجردبالا
- Village
- Location within Iran
- Coordinates: 28°40′49″N 57°40′50″E
- Country: Iran
- Province: Kerman
- County: Jiroft
- Bakhsh: Central
- Rural District: Halil

Population (2006)
  - Total: 39
- Time zone: UTC+3:30 (IRST)
  - Summer (DST): UTC+4:30 (IRDT)

Behjerd-e Bala (Persian: بهجردبالا, also Romanized as Behjerd-e Bālā; also known as Behjerd) is a village in Halil Rural District, in the Central District of Jiroft County, Kerman Province, Iran. At the 2006 census, its population was 39, in 9 families.
