= Sabur-e Bozorg =

Sabur-e Bozorg صبوربزرگ
- Village
- Location within Iran
- Coordinates: 31°08′28″N 50°28′49″E
- Country: Iran
- Province: Kohgiluyeh and Boyer-Ahmad
- County: Kohgiluyeh
- Bakhsh: Charusa
- Rural District: Tayebi-ye Sarhadi-ye Sharqi

Population (2006)
  - Total: 200
- Time zone: UTC+3:30 (IRST)
  - Summer (DST): UTC+4:30 (IRDT)

Sabur-e Bozorg (Persian: صبوربزرگ, also Romanized as Şabūr-e Bozorg) is a village in Tayebi-ye Sarhadi-ye Sharqi Rural District, Charusa District, Kohgiluyeh County, Kohgiluyeh and Boyer-Ahmad Province, Iran. At the 2006 census, its population was 200, in 34 families.
