= Tayebi-ye Sarhadi =

Tayebi-ye Sarhadi (Persian: طيبي سرحدئ) may refer to:

- Tayebi-ye Sarhadi-ye Gharbi Rural District
- Tayebi-ye Sarhadi-ye Sharqi Rural District
