= Kalab-e Olya =

Village in Kohgiluyeh and Boyer-Ahmad, Iran

Kalab-e Olya كلاب عليا
- Village
- Location within Iran
- Coordinates: 31°10′12″N 50°30′07″E
- Country: Iran
- Province: Kohgiluyeh and Boyer-Ahmad
- County: Kohgiluyeh
- Bakhsh: Charusa
- Rural District: Tayebi-ye Sarhadi-ye Gharbi

Population (2006)
  - Total: 90
- Time zone: UTC+3:30 (IRST)
  - Summer (DST): UTC+4:30 (IRDT)

Kalab-e Olya (Persian: كلاب عليا, also Romanized as Kalāb-e ‘Olyā) is a village in Tayebi-ye Sarhadi-ye Gharbi Rural District, Charusa District, Kohgiluyeh County, Kohgiluyeh and Boyer-Ahmad Province, Iran. At the 2006 census, its population was 90, in 15 families.
