= Kalab-e Ahmad =

Kalab-e Ahmad كلاب احمد
- Village
- Location within Iran
- Coordinates: 31°10′25″N 50°29′32″E
- Country: Iran
- Province: Kohgiluyeh and Boyer-Ahmad
- County: Kohgiluyeh
- Bakhsh: Charusa
- Rural District: Tayebi-ye Sarhadi-ye Gharbi

Population (2006)
  - Total: 123
- Time zone: UTC+3:30 (IRST)
  - Summer (DST): UTC+4:30 (IRDT)

Kalab-e Ahmad (Persian: كلاب احمد, also Romanized as Kalāb-e Aḩmad; also known as Kalāb) is a village in Tayebi-ye Sarhadi-ye Gharbi Rural District, Charusa District, Kohgiluyeh County, Kohgiluyeh and Boyer-Ahmad Province, Iran. At the 2006 census, its population was 123, in 24 families.
