= Kalab-e Sofla =

Kalab-e Sofla كلاب سفلي
- Village
- Location within Iran
- Coordinates: 31°09′24″N 50°31′10″E
- Country: Iran
- Province: Kohgiluyeh and Boyer-Ahmad
- County: Kohgiluyeh
- Bakhsh: Charusa
- Rural District: Tayebi-ye Sarhadi-ye Gharbi

Population (2006)
  - Total: 45
- Time zone: UTC+3:30 (IRST)
  - Summer (DST): UTC+4:30 (IRDT)

Kalab-e Sofla (Persian: كلاب سفلي, also Romanized as Kalāb-e Soflá) is a village in Tayebi-ye Sarhadi-ye Gharbi Rural District, Charusa District, Kohgiluyeh County, Kohgiluyeh and Boyer-Ahmad Province, Iran. At the 2006 census, its population was 45, in 8 families.
