= Murd-e Seyyed Gambuli =

Murd-e Seyyed Gambuli موردسيدگمبولي
- Village
- Location within Iran
- Coordinates: 31°08′21″N 50°29′30″E
- Country: Iran
- Province: Kohgiluyeh and Boyer-Ahmad
- County: Kohgiluyeh
- Bakhsh: Charusa
- Rural District: Tayebi-ye Sarhadi-ye Sharqi

Population (2006)
  - Total: 100
- Time zone: UTC+3:30 (IRST)
  - Summer (DST): UTC+4:30 (IRDT)

Murd-e Seyyed Gambuli (Persian: موردسيدگمبولي, also Romanized as Mūrd-e Seyyed Gambūlī; also known as Mūrd-e Seyyed) is a village in Tayebi-ye Sarhadi-ye Sharqi Rural District, Charusa District, Kohgiluyeh County, Kohgiluyeh and Boyer-Ahmad Province, Iran. At the 2006 census, its population was 100, in 16 families.
