= Ferdows Rural District (Jiroft County) =

Rural district in Kerman province, Iran

Ferdows Rural District Persian: دهستان فردوس
- Rural District
- Location within Iran
- Coordinates: 28°33′47″N 57°14′04″E
- Country: Iran
- Province: Kerman
- County: Jiroft
- District: Esfandaqeh
- Capital: Ferdows
- Time zone: UTC+3:30 (IRST)

Ferdows Rural District (Persian: دهستان فردوس) is in Esfandaqeh District of Jiroft County, Kerman province, Iran. Its capital is the village of Ferdows, whose population at the time of the 2016 National Census was 881 in 262 households.

== History ==
In 2017, Esfandaqeh Rural District was separated from the Central District in the establishment of Esfandaqeh District, and Ferdows Rural District was created in the new district.
