= Ferdousi (disambiguation) =

Ferdousi or Ferdausi is a unisex given name of Persian origin. Notable people with the name include:

== Given name ==
=== Ferdausi ===
- Ferdausi Rahman (born 1941), Bangladeshi playback singer

=== Ferdousi ===
- Ferdousi Begum, Bangladeshi politician
- Ferdousi Mazumder (born 1943), Bangladeshi actress
- Ferdousi Priyabhashini (1947–2018), Bangladeshi sculptor
- Ferdousi Shahriar (1971/72–2026), Bangladeshi diplomat

== See also ==
- Ferdowsi (disambiguation)
- Ferdous, a given name
