= Kalab-e Sufian-e Sofla =

Village in Kerman province, Iran

Kalab-e Sufian-e Sofla Persian: كلاب صوفيان سفلي
- Village
- Location within Iran
- Coordinates: 28°34′20″N 57°43′12″E
- Country: Iran
- Province: Kerman
- County: Jiroft
- District: Central
- Rural District: Khatunabad

Population (2016)
  - Total: 2,316
- Time zone: UTC+3:30 (IRST)

Kalab-e Sufian-e Sofla (Persian: كلاب صوفيان سفلي) (Note: Also romanized as Kalāb-e Şūfīān-e Soflá; also known as Kalāb-e Soflá, Kalāb Sūfīān, and Kalāb-e Şūfīān) is a village in Khatunabad Rural District of the Central District of Jiroft County, Kerman province, Iran.

== Demographics ==
=== Population ===
At the time of the 2006 National Census, the village's population was 1,053 in 220 households. The following census in 2011 counted 1,610 people in 396 households. The 2016 census measured the population of the village as 2,316 people in 604 households. It was the most populous village in its rural district.
