= Shutavar =

Village in Kohgiluyeh and Boyer-Ahmad province, Iran

Shutavar Persian: شوتاور
- Village
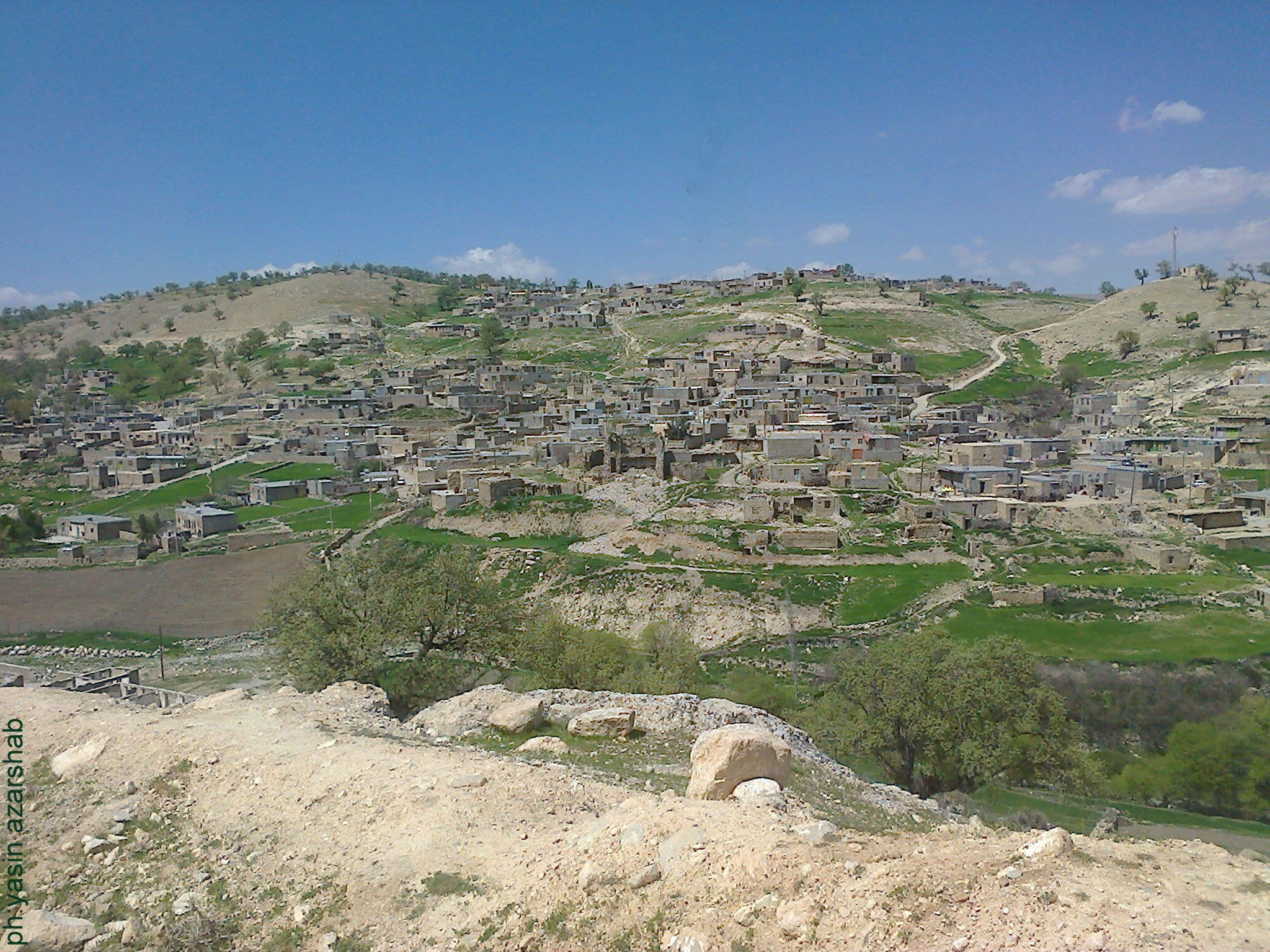
- View of Shutavar, Iran

- Location within Iran
- Coordinates: 31°11′41″N 50°23′04″E
- Country: Iran
- Province: Kohgiluyeh and Boyer-Ahmad
- County: Kohgiluyeh
- District: Charusa
- Rural District: Tayebi-ye Sarhadi-ye Gharbi

Population (2016)
  - Total: 899
- Time zone: UTC+3:30 (IRST)

Shutavar (Persian: شوتاور) (Note: Also romanized as Shootavar, Showtāvar, and Shūtāvar) is a village in Tayebi-ye Sarhadi-ye Gharbi Rural District of Charusa District, Kohgiluyeh County, Kohgiluyeh and Boyer-Ahmad province, Iran.

== Demographics ==
=== Population ===
At the time of the 2006 National Census, the village's population was 1,247 in 221 households. The following census in 2011 counted 1,030 people in 213 households. The 2016 census measured the population of the village as 899 people in 200 households. It was the most populous village in its rural district.
