= Huke =

Huke is a surname. Notable people with the surname include:

- Huke (born 1981), Japanese artist
- Kirsti Huke (born 1977), Norwegian musician and composer
- Michael Huke (born 1969), German sprinter
- Sebastian Huke (born 1989), German footballer
- Shane Huke (born 1985), English footballer
- Te Huke (born c. 1700), former king of Easter Island

== See also ==
- Hukerd, a village in Iran
