= Kalab-e Sufian =

Kalab-e Sufian (Persian: كلاب صوفيان) may refer to:

- Kalab-e Sufian-e Olya
- Kalab-e Sufian-e Sofla
