= Ferdows Rural District =

Ferdows Rural District (Persian: دهستان فردوس) may refer to:

- Ferdows Rural District (Jiroft County), Kerman province
- Ferdows Rural District (Rafsanjan County), Kerman province
- Ferdows Rural District (Shahriar County), Tehran province
