= Aliabad-e Omran =

City in Kerman province, Iran

Aliabad-e Omran Persian: علی‌آباد عمران
- City
- Location within Iran
- Coordinates: 28°32′32″N 57°51′17″E
- Country: Iran
- Province: Kerman
- County: Jiroft
- District: Central

Population (2016)
  - Total: 6,170
- Time zone: UTC+3:30 (IRST)

Aliabad-e Omran (Persian: علی‌آباد عمران) (Note: Formerly Aliabad (علي اباد), also romanized as ‘Alīābād) is a city in the Central District of Jiroft County, Kerman province, Iran.

== Demographics ==
=== Population ===
At the time of the 2006 National Census, Aliabad's population was 3,257 in 691 households, when it was the village of Aliabad in Dowlatabad Rural District. The following census in 2011 counted 6,064 people in 1,552 households. The 2016 census measured the population of the village as 6,170 people in 2,174 households. It was the most populous village in its rural district.

After the census, Aliabad merged with the village of Abbasabad and was elevated to city status as Aliabad-e Omran.
