= Ferdowsi (disambiguation) =

Ferdowsi (or Hakīm Abul-Qāsim Firdawsī Tūsī) was a 10th century Persian poet, author of the Shahnameh.

Ferdowsi (from Persian فردوسی; also romanized as Firdausi, Firdusi, or Firdawsi) may refer to:

== People ==
- Arash Ferdowsi (b. 1985), cofounder and chief technology officer of Dropbox
- Bobak Ferdowsi (b. 1979), an aerospace engineer who gained brief fame in 2012 as "NASA Mohawk Guy" during the landing of NASA's Curiosity Mars Rover
- Firdousi Begum, Indian politician

== Places ==
- Ferdowsi Gas Field, Iranian gas field in the Persian Gulf
- Ferdowsi University, in Mashhad, Iran
- Ferdowsi Metro Station, Tehran, Iran
- Ferdowsi Street, Tehran, Iran
- Ferdowsi Street, Tabriz, Tabriz, Iran
- Ferdowsi, North Khorasan, Iran

== Film ==
- Ferdowsi (film), 1934 film directed by Abdolhossein Sepanta

== See also ==
- Ferdousi (disambiguation)
- Ferdows (disambiguation)
- Ferdowsiyeh (disambiguation)
