= Ferdous =

Ferdous (Bengali: ফেরদৌস) is a Bangladeshi name that may refer to

- Ferdous Ahmed, Bangladeshi film actor
- Ferdous Ahmed Qurishi, Bangladeshi politician
- Ferdous Ara, Bangladeshi singer
- Ferdous Wahid, Bangladeshi pop singer and film director
- Hassan Ferdous (1929–1997), Iranian weightlifter
- Mohammad Ferdous Khan (died 2016), Bangladeshi educationist
- Nasim Ferdous, Bangladeshi diplomat
- Rahatul Ferdous (born 1995), Bangladeshi cricketer
- Tabassum Ferdous Shaon (born c. 1979), Bangladeshi beauty pageant

== See also ==
- Ferdows (disambiguation)
