= Javardeh, Kohgiluyeh and Boyer-Ahmad =

Village in Kohgiluyeh and Boyer-Ahmad province, Iran

Javardeh Persian: جاورده
- Village
- Location within Iran
- Coordinates: 31°07′21″N 50°30′20″E
- Country: Iran
- Province: Kohgiluyeh and Boyer-Ahmad
- County: Kohgiluyeh
- District: Charusa
- Rural District: Tayebi-ye Sarhadi-ye Sharqi

Population (2016)
  - Total: 1,276
- Time zone: UTC+3:30 (IRST)

Javardeh (Persian: جاورده) (Note: Also romanized as Jāvar Deh and Jāvardeh) is a village in, and the capital of, Tayebi-ye Sarhadi-ye Sharqi Rural District of Charusa District, Kohgiluyeh County, Kohgiluyeh and Boyer-Ahmad province, Iran.

== Demographics ==
=== Population ===
At the time of the 2006 National Census, the village's population was 1,582 in 239 households. The following census in 2011 counted 1,290 people in 278 households. The 2016 census measured the population of the village as 1,276 people in 332 households. It was the most populous village in its rural district.
