= Deh-e Sheykh, Khuzestan =

Deh-e Sheykh ده شيخ
- Village
- Location within Iran
- Coordinates: 32°03′29″N 49°49′19″E
- Country: Iran
- Province: Khuzestan
- County: Izeh
- Bakhsh: Susan
- Rural District: Susan-e Gharbi

Population (2006)
  - Total: 208
- Time zone: UTC+3:30 (IRST)
  - Summer (DST): UTC+4:30 (IRDT)

Deh-e Sheykh (Persian: ده شيخ, also Romanized as Deh-e Sheykh, Deh Sheikh, and Deh Sheykh; also known as Sheykh) is a village in Susan-e Gharbi Rural District, Susan District, Izeh County, Khuzestan Province, Iran. At the 2006 census, its population was 208, in 43 families.
