= Deh-e Sheykh, Sarbanan =

Deh-e Sheykh ده شيخ
- Village
- Location within Iran
- Coordinates: 31°00′43″N 56°37′29″E
- Country: Iran
- Province: Kerman
- County: Zarand
- Bakhsh: Central
- Rural District: Sarbanan

Population (2006)
  - Total: 189
- Time zone: UTC+3:30 (IRST)
  - Summer (DST): UTC+4:30 (IRDT)

Deh-e Sheykh (Persian: ده شيخ, also Romanized as Deh Sheykh) is a village in Sarbanan Rural District, in the Central District of Zarand County, Kerman Province, Iran. At the 2006 census, its population was 189, in 52 families.
