= Sargaz-e Khazor Safakalinu =

Sargaz-e Khazor Safakalinu سرگزخضرصفاكلينو
- Village
- Location within Iran
- Coordinates: 28°25′18″N 55°42′06″E
- Country: Iran
- Province: Hormozgan
- County: Hajjiabad
- Bakhsh: Central
- Rural District: Dar Agah

Population (2006)
  - Total: 79
- Time zone: UTC+3:30 (IRST)
  - Summer (DST): UTC+4:30 (IRDT)

Sargaz-e Khazor Safakalinu (Persian: سرگزخضرصفاكلينو, also Romanized as Sargaz-e Khaz̤or Şafākalīnū; also known as Gūr Şafā and Sargaz) is a village in Dar Agah Rural District, in the Central District of Hajjiabad County, Hormozgan Province, Iran. At the 2006 census, its population was 79, in 23 families.
