= Deh-e Sheykh, Mohammadabad =

Deh-e Sheykh ده شيخ
- Village
- Location within Iran
- Coordinates: 30°45′57″N 56°33′48″E
- Country: Iran
- Province: Kerman
- County: Zarand
- Bakhsh: Central
- Rural District: Mohammadabad

Population (2006)
  - Total: 275
- Time zone: UTC+3:30 (IRST)
  - Summer (DST): UTC+4:30 (IRDT)

Deh-e Sheykh (Persian: ده شيخ, also Romanized as Deh Shaikh; also known as Deh Sheikh Hoomeh Zarand) is a village in Mohammadabad Rural District, in the Central District of Zarand County, Kerman Province, Iran. At the 2006 census, its population was 275, in 63 families.
