= Deh Sheykh-e Pataveh =

Deh Sheykh-e Pataveh ده شيخ پاتاوه
- Village
- Location within Iran
- Coordinates: 30°56′11″N 51°15′28″E
- Country: Iran
- Province: Kohgiluyeh and Boyer-Ahmad
- County: Dana
- Bakhsh: Pataveh
- Rural District: Pataveh

Population (2006)
  - Total: 1,285
- Time zone: UTC+3:30 (IRST)
  - Summer (DST): UTC+4:30 (IRDT)

Deh Sheykh-e Pataveh (Persian: ده شيخ پاتاوه, also Romanized as Deh Sheykh-e Pātāveh; also known as Deh Sheykh) is a village in Pataveh Rural District, Pataveh District, Dana County, Kohgiluyeh and Boyer-Ahmad Province, Iran. At the 2006 census, its population was 1,285, in 248 families.
