= Ferdowsiyeh, Azadegan =

Ferdowsiyeh فردوسيه
- Village
- Location within Iran
- Coordinates: 30°31′31″N 56°03′21″E
- Country: Iran
- Province: Kerman
- County: Rafsanjan
- Bakhsh: Central
- Rural District: Azadegan

Population (2006)
  - Total: 1,525
- Time zone: UTC+3:30 (IRST)
  - Summer (DST): UTC+4:30 (IRDT)

Ferdowsiyeh (Persian: فردوسيه, also Romanized as Ferdowsīyeh; also known as Ferdowsiyeh Hoomeh, Ferdowsīyeh-ye Āzādegān, Ferdowsīyeh-ye Ḩasan Zādeh, and Ferdowsīyeh-ye Rafī’ī) is a village in Azadegan Rural District, in the Central District of Rafsanjan County, Kerman Province, Iran. At the 2006 census, its population was 1,525, in 384 families.
