= Jangalabad, Anbarabad =

Jangalabad جنگل اباد
- Village
- Location within Iran
- Coordinates: 28°16′12″N 57°47′37″E
- Country: Iran
- Province: Kerman
- County: Anbarabad
- Bakhsh: Esmaili
- Rural District: Esmaili

Population (2006)
  - Total: 147
- Time zone: UTC+3:30 (IRST)
  - Summer (DST): UTC+4:30 (IRDT)

Jangalabad (Persian: جنگل اباد, also Romanized as Jangalābād; also known as Jangalābād-e Bālā) is a village in Esmaili Rural District, Esmaili District, Anbarabad County, Kerman Province, Iran. At the 2006 census, its population was 147, in 28 families.
