= Jangalabad, Rigan =

Jangalabad جنگل اباد
- Village
- Location within Iran
- Coordinates: 28°39′39″N 59°15′14″E
- Country: Iran
- Province: Kerman
- County: Rigan
- Bakhsh: Central
- Rural District: Rigan

Population (2006)
  - Total: 32
- Time zone: UTC+3:30 (IRST)
  - Summer (DST): UTC+4:30 (IRDT)

Jangalabad (Persian: جنگل اباد, also Romanized as Jangalābād) is a village in Rigan Rural District, in the Central District of Rigan County, Kerman Province, Iran. At the 2006 census, its population was 32, in 7 families.
