= Deh Sheykh, Shiraz =

Deh Sheykh ده شيخ
- Village
- Location within Iran
- Coordinates: 29°38′00″N 52°19′04″E
- Country: Iran
- Province: Fars
- County: Shiraz
- Bakhsh: Arzhan
- Rural District: Qarah Chaman

Population (2006)
  - Total: 257
- Time zone: UTC+3:30 (IRST)
  - Summer (DST): UTC+4:30 (IRDT)

Deh Sheykh (Persian: ده شيخ, also Romanized as Deh Shaikh) is a village in Qarah Chaman Rural District, Arzhan District, Shiraz County, Fars province, Iran. At the 2006 census, its population was 257, in 57 families.
