= Deh-e Sheykh, Sonqor =

Deh-e Sheykh ده شيخ
- Village
- Location within Iran
- Coordinates: 34°52′32″N 47°27′24″E
- Country: Iran
- Province: Kermanshah
- County: Sonqor
- Bakhsh: Kolyai
- Rural District: Satar

Population (2006)
  - Total: 211
- Time zone: UTC+3:30 (IRST)
  - Summer (DST): UTC+4:30 (IRDT)

Deh-e Sheykh (Persian: ده شيخ, also Romanized as Deh Sheykh) is a village in Satar Rural District, Kolyai District, Sonqor County, Kermanshah Province, Iran. At the 2006 census, its population was 211, in 54 families.
