= Deh-e Sheykh, Arzuiyeh =

Deh-e Sheykh ده شيخ
- Village
- Location within Iran
- Coordinates: 28°16′43″N 56°17′45″E
- Country: Iran
- Province: Kerman
- County: Arzuiyeh
- Bakhsh: Central
- Rural District: Arzuiyeh

Population (2006)
  - Total: 213
- Time zone: UTC+3:30 (IRST)
  - Summer (DST): UTC+4:30 (IRDT)

Deh-e Sheykh (Persian: ده شيخ, also Romanized as Deh-e Sheykh, Deh Shaikh, and Deh Sheykh; also known as Deh-e Sheykh Arzū’īyeh and Deh Sheikh Arzoo’eyeh) is a village in Arzuiyeh Rural District, in the Central District of Arzuiyeh County, Kerman Province, Iran. At the 2006 census, its population was 213, in 55 families.
