= Gazabad, Qaleh Ganj =

Gazabad گز اباد
- Village
- Location within Iran
- Coordinates: 27°48′28″N 58°17′31″E
- Country: Iran
- Province: Kerman
- County: Qaleh Ganj
- Bakhsh: Central
- Rural District: Sorkh Qaleh

Population (2006)
  - Total: 120
- Time zone: UTC+3:30 (IRST)
  - Summer (DST): UTC+4:30 (IRDT)

Gazabad (Persian: گز اباد, also Romanized as Gazābād) is a village in Sorkh Qaleh Rural District, in the Central District of Qaleh Ganj County, Kerman Province, Iran. At the 2006 census, its population was 120, in 30 families.
