= Deh-e Murd-e Olya =

Deh-e Murd-e Olya ده موردعليا
- Village
- Location within Iran
- Coordinates: 31°02′34″N 50°09′11″E
- Country: Iran
- Province: Kohgiluyeh and Boyer-Ahmad
- County: Bahmai
- Bakhsh: Bahmai-ye Garmsiri
- Rural District: Sar Asiab-e Yusefi

Population (2006)
  - Total: 81
- Time zone: UTC+3:30 (IRST)
  - Summer (DST): UTC+4:30 (IRDT)

Deh-e Murd-e Olya (Persian: ده موردعليا, also Romanized as Deh-e Mūrd-e ‘Olyā; also known as Deh-e Mūrd and Mūrd) is a village in Sar Asiab-e Yusefi Rural District, Bahmai-ye Garmsiri District, Bahmai County, Kohgiluyeh and Boyer-Ahmad Province, Iran. At the 2006 census, its population was 81, in 12 families.
