= Ferdows, Rigan =

Ferdows فردوس
- Village
- Location within Iran
- Coordinates: 28°45′15″N 58°52′11″E
- Country: Iran
- Province: Kerman
- County: Rigan
- Bakhsh: Gonbaki
- Rural District: Gonbaki

Population (2006)
  - Total: 47
- Time zone: UTC+3:30 (IRST)
  - Summer (DST): UTC+4:30 (IRDT)

Ferdows (Persian: فردوس) is a village in Gonbaki Rural District, Gonbaki District, Rigan County, Kerman Province, Iran. At the 2006 census, its population was 47, in 11 families.
