= Murd-e Susani =

Murd-e Susani موردسوسني
- Village
- Location within Iran
- Coordinates: 29°47′43″N 52°12′25″E
- Country: Iran
- Province: Fars
- County: Shiraz
- Bakhsh: Arzhan
- Rural District: Qarah Chaman

Population (2006)
  - Total: 47
- Time zone: UTC+3:30 (IRST)
  - Summer (DST): UTC+4:30 (IRDT)

Murd-e Susani (Persian: موردسوسني, also Romanized as Mūrd-e Sūsanī; also known as Mowrsūsanī) is a village in Qarah Chaman Rural District, Arzhan District, Shiraz County, Fars province, Iran. At the 2006 census, its population was 47, in 12 families.
