= Deh Sheykh, Lamerd =

Deh Sheykh ده شيخ
- Village
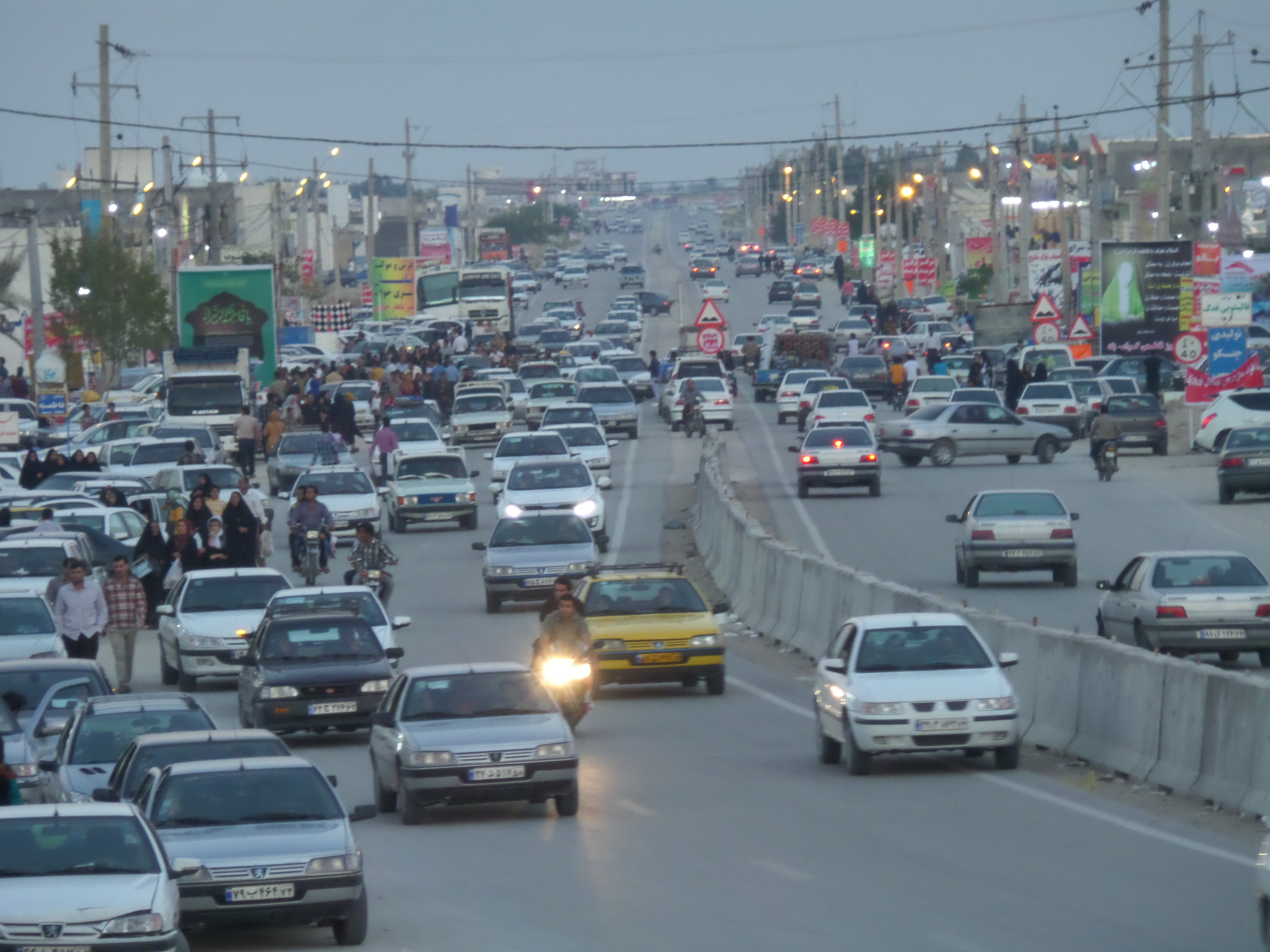

- Location within Iran
- Coordinates: 27°18′02″N 53°16′58″E
- Country: Iran
- Province: Fars
- County: Lamerd
- Bakhsh: Central
- Rural District: Sigar

Population (2006)
  - Total: 1,036
- Time zone: UTC+3:30 (IRST)
  - Summer (DST): UTC+4:30 (IRDT)

Deh Sheykh (Persian: ده شيخ, also Romanized as Deh Sheikh) is a village in Sigar Rural District, in the Central District of Lamerd County, Fars province, Iran. At the 2006 census, its population was 1,036, in 212 families.
