= Deh-e Sheykh Dilgun =

Deh-e Sheykh Dilgun ده شيخ ديلگون
- Village
- Location within Iran
- Coordinates: 30°44′00″N 51°09′37″E
- Country: Iran
- Province: Kohgiluyeh and Boyer-Ahmad
- County: Boyer-Ahmad
- Bakhsh: Central
- Rural District: Sepidar

Population (2006)
  - Total: 96
- Time zone: UTC+3:30 (IRST)
  - Summer (DST): UTC+4:30 (IRDT)

Deh-e Sheykh Dilgun (Persian: ده شيخ ديلگون, also Romanized as Deh Sheykh-e Dīlgūn; also known as Deh-e Sheykh and Deh Sheykh-e Delīgān) is a village in Sepidar Rural District, in the Central District of Boyer-Ahmad County, Kohgiluyeh and Boyer-Ahmad Province, Iran. At the 2006 census, its population was 96, in 14 families.
