= Sar Murd =

Sar Murd سرمورد
- Village
- Location within Iran
- Coordinates: 31°24′48″N 49°58′58″E
- Country: Iran
- Province: Khuzestan
- County: Bagh-e Malek
- Bakhsh: Central
- Rural District: Haparu

Population (2006)
  - Total: 272
- Time zone: UTC+3:30 (IRST)
  - Summer (DST): UTC+4:30 (IRDT)

Sar Murd (Persian: سرمورد, also Romanized as Sar Mūrd; also known as Mūrd) is a village in Haparu Rural District, in the Central District of Bagh-e Malek County, Khuzestan Province, Iran. At the 2006 census, its population was 272, in 52 families.
