= Deh Murd =

Deh Murd ده مورد
- Village
- Location within Iran
- Coordinates: 31°50′56″N 50°03′11″E
- Country: Iran
- Province: Khuzestan
- County: Izeh
- Bakhsh: Central
- Rural District: Howmeh-ye Sharqi

Population (2006)
  - Total: 148
- Time zone: UTC+3:30 (IRST)
  - Summer (DST): UTC+4:30 (IRDT)

Deh Murd (Persian: ده مورد, also Romanized as Deh Mūrd) is a village in Howmeh-ye Sharqi Rural District, in the Central District of Izeh County, Khuzestan Province, Iran. At the 2006 census, its population was 148, in 25 families.
