= Qaleh Raisi =

City in Kohgiluyeh and Boyer-Ahmad province, Iran

Qaleh Raisi Persian: قلعه رئيسي
- City
- Location within Iran
- Coordinates: 31°11′18″N 50°26′31″E
- Country: Iran
- Province: Kohgiluyeh and Boyer-Ahmad
- County: Kohgiluyeh
- District: Charusa

Population (2016)
  - Total: 3,269
- Time zone: UTC+3:30 (IRST)

Qaleh Raisi (Persian: قلعه رئيسي) (Note: Also romanized as Qal‘eh Raīsī, Qal‘eh-ye Ra’īsī, and Qal‘eh-ye Re’īsī; also known as Charusa (چاروسا), also romanized as Chārūsā; and also known as Ghal‘eh Ra’īsī and Qal‘eh-ye Razeh) is a city in, and the capital of, Charusa District of Kohgiluyeh County, Kohgiluyeh and Boyer-Ahmad province, Iran. It also serves as the administrative center for Tayebi-ye Sarhadi-ye Gharbi Rural District.

== Demographics ==
=== Population ===
At the time of the 2006 National Census, the city's population was 2,604 in 491 households. The following census in 2011 counted 3,562 people in 731 households. The 2016 census measured the population of the city as 3,269 people in 750 households.
