= Deh-e Sheykh-e Do =

Deh-e Sheykh-e Do ده شيخ 2
- Village
- Location within Iran
- Coordinates: 30°30′54″N 57°15′09″E
- Country: Iran
- Province: Kerman
- County: Kerman
- Bakhsh: Central
- Rural District: Derakhtengan

Population (2006)
  - Total: 19
- Time zone: UTC+3:30 (IRST)
  - Summer (DST): UTC+4:30 (IRDT)

Deh-e Sheykh-e Do (Persian: ده شيخ 2; also known as Deh-e Sheykh) is a village in Derakhtengan Rural District, in the Central District of Kerman County, Kerman Province, Iran. At the 2006 census, its population was 19, in 5 families.
