= Deh Sheykh-e Tasuj =

Deh Sheykh-e Tasuj ده شيخ طسوج
- Village
- Location within Iran
- Coordinates: 30°41′34″N 51°05′47″E
- Country: Iran
- Province: Kohgiluyeh and Boyer-Ahmad
- County: Charam
- Bakhsh: Central
- Rural District: Charam

Population (2006)
  - Total: 182
- Time zone: UTC+3:30 (IRST)
  - Summer (DST): UTC+4:30 (IRDT)

Deh Sheykh-e Tasuj (Persian: ده شيخ طسوج, also Romanized as Deh Sheykh-e Ţasūj) is a village in Charam Rural District, in the Central District of Charam County, Kohgiluyeh and Boyer-Ahmad Province, Iran. At the 2006 census, its population was 182, in 28 families.
