= Murd, Hormozgan =

Coordinates: 32.0483°N 49.4056°E

Murd مورد
- Village
- Interactive map of Murd
- Country: Iran
- Province: Hormozgan
- County: Bastak
- Bakhsh: Central
- Rural District: Deh Tall

Population (2006)
  - Total: 24
- Time zone: UTC+3:30 (IRST)
  - Summer (DST): UTC+4:30 (IRDT)

Murd (Persian: مورد, also Romanized as Mūrd) is a village in Deh Tall Rural District, in the Central District of Bastak County, Hormozgan Province, Iran. At the 2006 census, its population was 24, in 5 families.
