= Murd, Andika =

Murd مورد
- Village
- Location within Iran
- Coordinates: 32°03′13″N 49°24′07″E
- Country: Iran
- Province: Khuzestan
- County: Andika
- Bakhsh: Abezhdan
- Rural District: Abezhdan

Population (2006)
  - Total: 381
- Time zone: UTC+3:30 (IRST)
  - Summer (DST): UTC+4:30 (IRDT)

Murd (Persian: مورد, also Romanized as Mūrd; also known as Mūrd Sāmānī) is a village in Abezhdan Rural District, Abezhdan District, Andika County, Khuzestan Province, Iran. At the 2006 census, its population was 381, in 60 families.
