= Gazabad-e Manuchehri =

Gazabad-e Manuchehri گزابادمنوچهري
- Village
- Location within Iran
- Coordinates: 28°23′12″N 57°43′41″E
- Country: Iran
- Province: Kerman
- County: Anbarabad
- Bakhsh: Esmaili
- Rural District: Hoseynabad

Population (2006)
  - Total: 46
- Time zone: UTC+3:30 (IRST)
  - Summer (DST): UTC+4:30 (IRDT)

Gazabad-e Manuchehri (Persian: گزابادمنوچهري, also Romanized as Gazābād-e Manūchehrī; also known as Gazābād and Qātemīyeh) is a village in Hoseynabad Rural District, Esmaili District, Anbarabad County, Kerman Province, Iran. According to the 2006 census, its population was 46, in 11 families.
