= Jangalabad, Manujan =

Jangalabad جنگل اباد
- Village
- Country: Iran
- Province: Kerman
- County: Manujan
- Bakhsh: Central
- Rural District: Qaleh

Population (2006)
  - Total: 96
- Time zone: UTC+3:30 (IRST)
  - Summer (DST): UTC+4:30 (IRDT)

Jangalabad (Persian: جنگل اباد, also Romanized as Jangalābād) is a village in Qaleh Rural District, in the Central District of Manujan County, Kerman Province, Iran. At the 2006 census, its population was 96, in 20 families.
