= Esfandaqeh District =

District in Kerman province, Iran

Esfandaqeh District Persian: بخش اسفندقه
- District
- Location within Iran
- Coordinates: 28°35′15″N 57°13′54″E
- Country: Iran
- Province: Kerman
- County: Jiroft
- Capital: Dowlatabad
- Time zone: UTC+3:30 (IRST)

Esfandaqeh District (Persian: بخش اسفندقه) is in Jiroft County, Kerman province, Iran. Its capital is the village of Dowlatabad, whose population at the time of the National Census of 2016 was 4,930 in 1,387 households.

== History ==
In 2017, Esfandaqeh Rural District was separated from the Central District in the formation of Esfandaqeh District.

== Demographics ==
=== Administrative divisions ===
Esfandaqeh District
Administrative Divisions
Esfandaqeh RD
Ferdows RD
RD = Rural District
