= Ferdowsiyeh, Narmashir =

Ferdowsiyeh فردوسيه
- Village
- Location within Iran
- Coordinates: 28°55′54″N 58°45′51″E
- Country: Iran
- Province: Kerman
- County: Narmashir
- Bakhsh: Central
- Rural District: Azizabad

Population (2006)
  - Total: 787
- Time zone: UTC+3:30 (IRST)
  - Summer (DST): UTC+4:30 (IRDT)

Ferdowsiyeh (Persian: فردوسيه, also Romanized as Ferdowsīyeh; also known as Ferdows, Ferdowsī, and Gorāzābād) is a village in Azizabad Rural District, in the Central District of Narmashir County, Kerman Province, Iran. At the 2006 census, its population was 787, in 170 families.
