= Halil Rural District =

Rural district in Kerman province, Iran

Halil Rural District Persian: دهستان هليل
- Rural District
- Location within Iran
- Coordinates: 28°48′45″N 57°35′20″E
- Country: Iran
- Province: Kerman
- County: Jiroft
- District: Central

Population (2016)
  - Total: 10,187
- Time zone: UTC+3:30 (IRST)

Halil Rural District (Persian: دهستان هليل) is in the Central District of Jiroft County, Kerman province, Iran. Its capital was the village of Kahuruiyeh, now a neighborhood in the city of Jiroft.

== Demographics ==
=== Population ===
At the time of the 2006 National Census, the rural district's population was 5,856 in 1,343 households. There were 8,976 inhabitants in 2,407 households at the following census of 2011. The 2016 census measured the population of the rural district as 10,187 in 2,942 households. The most populous of its 69 villages was Poshtlor, with 1,552 people.
