= Khatunabad Rural District (Jiroft County) =

Rural district in Kerman province, Iran

Khatunabad Rural District Persian: دهستان خاتون آباد
- Rural District
- Location within Iran
- Coordinates: 28°34′34″N 57°38′24″E
- Country: Iran
- Province: Kerman
- County: Jiroft
- District: Central
- Capital: Khatunabad

Population (2016)
  - Total: 12,982
- Time zone: UTC+3:30 (IRST)

Khatunabad Rural District (Persian: دهستان خاتون آباد) is in the Central District of Jiroft County, Kerman province, Iran. Its capital is the village of Khatunabad.

== Demographics ==
=== Population ===
At the time of the 2006 National Census, the rural district's population was 9,459 in 2,055 households. There were 11,655 inhabitants in 3,039 households at the following census of 2011. The 2016 census measured the population of the rural district as 12,982 in 3,653 households. The most populous of its 19 villages was Kalab-e Sufian-e Sofla, with 2,316 people.
