= Dowlatabad Rural District (Jiroft County) =

Rural district in Kerman province, Iran

Dowlatabad Rural District Persian: دهستان دولت آباد
- Rural District
- Location within Iran
- Coordinates: 28°38′06″N 57°51′22″E
- Country: Iran
- Province: Kerman
- County: Jiroft
- District: Central
- Capital: Dowlatabad

Population (2016)
  - Total: 21,348
- Time zone: UTC+3:30 (IRST)

Dowlatabad Rural District (Persian: دهستان دولت آباد) is in the Central District of Jiroft County, Kerman province, Iran. Its capital is the village of Dowlatabad.

== Demographics ==
=== Population ===
At the time of the 2006 National Census, the rural district's population was 14,731 in 3,163 households. There were 20,976 inhabitants in 5,451 households in the following census of 2011. The 2016 census measured the population of the rural district as 21,438 in 6,296 households. The most populous of its 29 villages was Aliabad, with 6,170 people.
