= Esfandaqeh Rural District =

Rural district in Kerman province, Iran

Esfandaqeh Rural District Persian: دهستان اسفندقه
- Rural District
- Location within Iran
- Coordinates: 28°48′50″N 57°08′54″E
- Country: Iran
- Province: Kerman
- County: Jiroft
- District: Esfandaqeh
- Capital: Dowlatabad

Population (2016)
  - Total: 12,310
- Time zone: UTC+3:30 (IRST)

Esfandaqeh Rural District (Persian: دهستان اسفندقه) is in Esfandaqeh District of Jiroft County, Kerman province, Iran. Its capital is the village of Dowlatabad.

== Demographics ==
=== Population ===
At the time of the 2006 National Census, the rural district's population (as a part of the Central District) was 7,224 in 1,549 households. There were 13,235 inhabitants in 3,345 households at the following census of 2011. The 2016 census measured the population of the rural district as 12,310 in 3,531 households. The largest of its 94 villages was Dowlatabad, with 4,930 people.

In 2017, the rural district was separated from the district in the formation of Esfandaqeh District.
