= Tayebi-ye Sarhadi-ye Gharbi Rural District =

Rural district in Kohgiluyeh and Boyer-Ahmad province, Iran

Tayebi-ye Sarhadi-ye Gharbi Rural District Persian: دهستان طيبي سرحدئ غربي
- Rural District
- Location within Iran
- Coordinates: 31°13′09″N 50°23′45″E
- Country: Iran
- Province: Kohgiluyeh and Boyer-Ahmad
- County: Kohgiluyeh
- District: Charusa
- Capital: Qaleh Raisi

Population (2016)
  - Total: 7,449
- Time zone: UTC+3:30 (IRST)

Tayebi-ye Sarhadi-ye Gharbi Rural District (Persian: دهستان طيبي سرحدئ غربي) is in Charusa District of Kohgiluyeh County, Kohgiluyeh and Boyer-Ahmad province, in southwestern Iran. It is administered from the city of Qaleh Raisi.

== Demographics ==
=== Population ===
At the time of the 2006 National Census, the rural district's population was 9,993 in 1,894 households. There were 8,115 inhabitants in 1,699 households at the following census of 2011. The 2016 census measured the population of the rural district as 7,449 in 1,755 households. The most populous of its 80 villages was Shutavar, with 899 people.
