= Tayebi-ye Sarhadi-ye Sharqi Rural District =

Rural district in Kohgiluyeh and Boyer-Ahmad province, Iran

Tayebi-ye Sarhadi-ye Sharqi Rural District Persian: دهستان طيبي سرحدئ شرقي
- Rural District
- Location within Iran
- Coordinates: 31°12′13″N 50°35′00″E
- Country: Iran
- Province: Kohgiluyeh and Boyer-Ahmad
- County: Kohgiluyeh
- District: Charusa
- Capital: Javardeh

Population (2016)
  - Total: 5,835
- Time zone: UTC+3:30 (IRST)

Tayebi-ye Sarhadi-ye Sharqi Rural District (Persian: دهستان طيبي سرحدئ شرقي) is in Charusa District of Kohgiluyeh County, Kohgiluyeh and Boyer-Ahmad province, Iran. Its capital is the village of Javardeh.

== Demographics ==
=== Population ===
At the time of the 2006 National Census, the rural district's population was 9,063 in 1,635 households. There were 6,266 inhabitants in 1,482 households at the following census of 2011. The 2016 census measured the population of the rural district as 5,835 in 1,511 households. The most populous of its 98 villages was Javardeh, with 1,276 people.
