= Jiroft County =

County in Kerman province, Iran

Jiroft County Persian: شهرستان جيرفت
- County
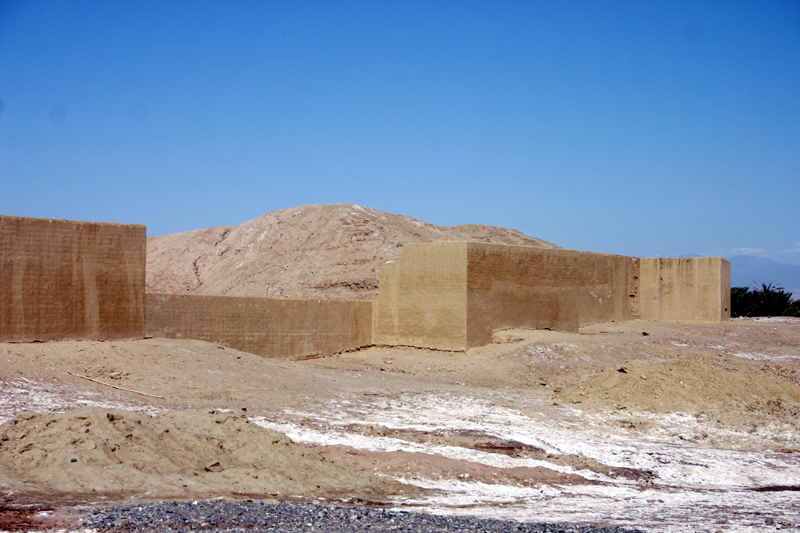
- Ruins, Jiroft County

- Location of Jiroft County in Kerman province (center, green)

- Location of Kerman province in Iran
- Coordinates: 28°44′30″N 57°34′00″E
- Country: Iran
- Province: Kerman
- Capital: Jiroft
- Districts: Central, Esfandaqeh, Esmaili, Jebalbarez, Sarduiyeh

Population (2016)
  - Total: 308,858
- Time zone: UTC+3:30 (IRST)

Jiroft County (Persian: شهرستان جيرفت) (Note: Also romanized as Šahrestāne Jiroft) is in Kerman province, Iran. Its capital is the city of Jiroft.

== History ==
=== Early civilization ===
The Jiroft plain has had towns and villages since the early Bronze Age.

=== Administrative history ===
After the 2006 National Census, Esmaili District was separated from Anbarabad County to join Jiroft County. In 2013, the village of Boluk was elevated to the status of a city after merging with several villages.

In 2017, Esfandaqeh Rural District was separated from the Central District in the formation of Esfandaqeh District, including the new Ferdows Rural District. In 2019, the village of Aliabad was elevated to city status as Aliabad-e Omran.

== Demographics ==
=== Population ===
At the time of the 2006 census, the county's population was 181,300 in 38,307 households. The following census in 2011 counted 277,748 people in 68,618 households. The 2016 census measured the population of the county as 308,858 in 92,937 households.

== Administrative divisions ==
Jiroft County's population history and administrative structure over three consecutive censuses are shown in the following table.

Jiroft County Population
Administrative Divisions	2006	2011	2016
Central District	143,590	179,836	203,770
Dowlatabad RD	14,731	20,976	21,438
Esfandaqeh RD	7,224	13,235	12,310
Eslamabad RD	11,289	13,960	16,424
Halil RD	5,856	8,976	10,187
Khatunabad RD	9,459	11,655	12,982
Aliabad-e Omran (city) (Note: Formerly Aliabad, became a city after the 2016 census)			
Jiroft (city)	95,031	111,034	130,429
Esfandaqeh District (Note: Established after the 2016 census)			
Esfandaqeh RD			
Ferdows RD			
Esmaili District (Note: Transferred from Anbarabad County)		41,963	42,786
Esmaili RD		14,450	9,056
Ganjabad RD		9,852	10,977
Hoseynabad RD		17,661	17,449
Boluk (city)			5,304
Jebalbarez District	12,225	19,570	23,137
Maskun RD	3,290	5,441	5,040
Rezvan RD	2,555	5,072	5,449
Saghder RD	3,741	4,641	5,898
Jebalbarez (city) (Note: Formerly the village of Mohammadabad)	2,639	4,416	6,750
Sarduiyeh District	25,485	36,379	39,158
Dalfard RD	4,385	6,157	6,620
Gevar RD	5,050	7,857	6,339
Sarduiyeh RD	12,594	15,827	15,529
Darb-e Behesht (city)	3,456	6,538	10,670
Total	181,300	277,748	308,858
RD = Rural District

== See also ==
Media related to Jiroft County at Wikimedia Commons
