= Central District (Jiroft County) =

District in Kerman province, Iran

Central District (Jiroft County) Persian: بخش مرکزی شهرستان جيرفت
- District
- Location within Iran
- Coordinates: 28°45′02″N 57°40′03″E
- Country: Iran
- Province: Kerman
- County: Jiroft
- Capital: Jiroft

Population (2016)
  - Total: 203,770
- Time zone: UTC+3:30 (IRST)

The Central District of Jiroft County (Persian: بخش مرکزی شهرستان جيرفت) is in Kerman province, Iran. Its capital is the city of Jiroft.

== History ==
In 2017, Esfandaqeh Rural District was separated from the district in the establishment of Esfandaqeh District. In 2019, the village of Aliabad was elevated to city status as Aliabad-e Omran.

== Demographics ==
=== Population ===
At the time of the 2006 National Census, the district's population was 143,590 in 30,350 households. The following census in 2011 counted 179,836 people in 43,464 households. The 2016 census measured the population of the district as 203,770 inhabitants in 60,684 households.

=== Administrative divisions ===
Central District (Jiroft County) Population
Administrative Divisions	2006	2011	2016
Dowlatabad RD	14,731	20,976	21,438
Esfandaqeh RD (Note: Transferred to Esfandaqeh District after the 2016 census)	7,224	13,235	12,310
Eslamabad RD	11,289	13,960	16,424
Halil RD	5,856	8,976	10,187
Khatunabad RD	9,459	11,655	12,982
Aliabad-e Omran (city) (Note: Formerly Aliabad, became a city after the 2016 census)			
Jiroft (city)	95,031	111,034	130,429
Total	143,590	179,836	203,770
RD = Rural District
