= Charusa District =

District in Kohgiluyeh and Boyer-Ahmad province, Iran

Charusa District Persian: بخش چاروسا
- District
- Location within Iran
- Coordinates: 31°13′07″N 50°22′07″E
- Country: Iran
- Province: Kohgiluyeh and Boyer-Ahmad
- County: Kohgiluyeh
- Capital: Qaleh Raisi

Population (2016)
  - Total: 16,553
- Time zone: UTC+3:30 (IRST)

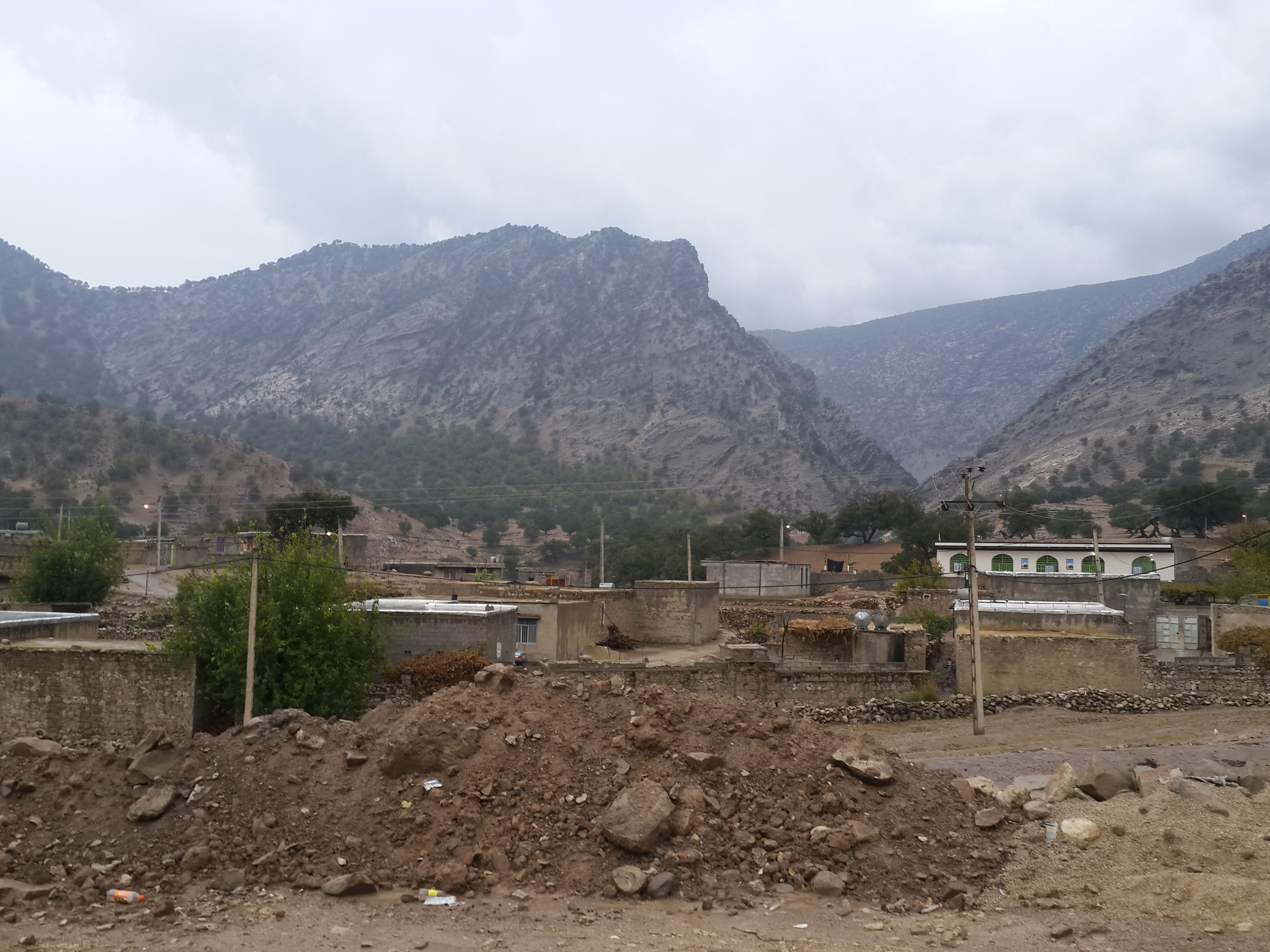

Charusa District (Persian: بخش چاروسا) is in Kohgiluyeh County, Kohgiluyeh and Boyer-Ahmad province, in southwestern Iran. Its capital is the city of Qaleh Raisi.

== Demographics ==
=== Population ===
At the time of the 2006 National Census, the district's population was 21,660 in 4,020 households. The following census in 2011 counted 17,943 people in 3,912 households. The 2016 census measured the population of the district as 16,553 inhabitants in 4,016 households.

=== Administrative divisions ===
Charusa District Population
| Administrative Divisions | 2006 | 2011 | 2016 |
|---|---|---|---|
| Tayebi-ye Sarhadi-ye Gharbi RD | 9,993 | 8,115 | 7,449 |
| Tayebi-ye Sarhadi-ye Sharqi RD | 9,063 | 6,266 | 5,835 |
| Qaleh Raisi (city) | 2,604 | 3,562 | 3,269 |
| Total | 21,660 | 17,943 | 16,553 |
RD = Rural District
