= Dumar =

Dumar, may refer to:

People

- Dumar (prince)

Places

- Dumar-e Olya
- Dumar-e Meyani
- Dumar-e Sofla
