= Naduiyeh =

Naduiyeh or Nadueeyeh (Persian: ندوئيه) may refer to places in Iran:

- Naduiyeh-ye Miani
- Naduiyeh-ye Olya
- Naduiyeh-ye Sofla
