= Hishin =

Hishin (Persian: حيشين) may refer to:

- Hishin-e Olya
- Hishin-e Sofla
