= Kalu Gondeh =

Kalu Gondeh كلوگنده
- Village
- Location within Iran
- Coordinates: 28°38′44″N 57°54′44″E
- Country: Iran
- Province: Kerman
- County: Jiroft
- Bakhsh: Jebalbarez
- Rural District: Rezvan

Population (2006)
  - Total: 33
- Time zone: UTC+3:30 (IRST)
  - Summer (DST): UTC+4:30 (IRDT)

Kalu Gondeh (Persian: كلوگنده, also Romanized as Kalū Gondeh and Kelu Gondeh; also known as Kal Gondeh and Kalū Kandeh) is a village in Rezvan Rural District, Jebalbarez District, Jiroft County, Kerman Province, Iran. At the 2006 census, its population was 33, in 7 families.
