= Darujin =

Darujin دروجين
- village
- Location within Iran
- Coordinates: 28°43′32″N 57°56′35″E
- Country: Iran
- Province: Kerman
- County: Jiroft
- Bakhsh: Jebalbarez
- Rural District: Rezvan

Population (2006)
  - Total: 87
- Time zone: UTC+3:30 (IRST)
  - Summer (DST): UTC+4:30 (IRDT)

Darujin (Persian: دروجين, also Romanized as Darūjīn) is a village in Rezvan Rural District, Jebalbarez District, Jiroft County, Kerman Province, Iran. At the 2006 census, its population was 87, in 18 families.
