= Nahr Khatun =

Nahr Khatun نهرخاتون
- Village
- Location within Iran
- Coordinates: 28°54′00″N 57°50′00″E
- Country: Iran
- Province: Kerman
- County: Jiroft
- Bakhsh: Jebalbarez
- Rural District: Maskun

Population (2006)
  - Total: 19
- Time zone: UTC+3:30 (IRST)
  - Summer (DST): UTC+4:30 (IRDT)

Nahr Khatun (Persian: نهرخاتون, also Romanized as Nahr Khātūn) is a village in Maskun Rural District, Jebalbarez District, Jiroft County, Kerman Province, Iran. At the 2006 census, its population was 19, in 5 families.
