= Pidanguiyeh =

Pidanguiyeh پيدنگوئيه
- Village
- Location within Iran
- Coordinates: 28°56′28″N 58°06′01″E
- Country: Iran
- Province: Kerman
- County: Jiroft
- Bakhsh: Jebalbarez
- Rural District: Saghder

Population (2006)
  - Total: 75
- Time zone: UTC+3:30 (IRST)
  - Summer (DST): UTC+4:30 (IRDT)

Pidanguiyeh (Persian: پيدنگوئيه, also Romanized as Pīdangū’īyeh; also known as Pīdangū) is a village in Saghder Rural District, Jebalbarez District, Jiroft County, Kerman Province, Iran. At the 2006 census, its population was 75, in 23 families.
