= Goraghan-e Tangan =

Goraghan-e Tangan گراغان تنگان
- Village
- Location within Iran
- Coordinates: 28°57′00″N 57°46′00″E
- Country: Iran
- Province: Kerman
- County: Jiroft
- Bakhsh: Jebalbarez
- Rural District: Saghder

Population (2006)
  - Total: 74
- Time zone: UTC+3:30 (IRST)
  - Summer (DST): UTC+4:30 (IRDT)

Goraghan-e Tangan (Persian: گراغان تنگان, also Romanized as Gorāghān-e Tangān) is a village in Saghder Rural District, Jebalbarez District, Jiroft County, Kerman Province, Iran. At the 2006 census, its population was 74, in 22 families.
