= Gavkan (disambiguation) =

Gavkan is a city in East Azerbaijan Province, Iran.

Gavkan (Persian: گاوكان) may also refer to:

- Gavkan-e Bagh, Kerman Province
- Gavkan-e Guran, Kerman Province
- Gavkan Rural District, in Kerman Province
