= Patomha =

Patomha پاتمها
- Village
- Location within Iran
- Coordinates: 28°39′44″N 57°54′55″E
- Country: Iran
- Province: Kerman
- County: Jiroft
- Bakhsh: Jebalbarez
- Rural District: Rezvan

Population (2006)
  - Total: 112
- Time zone: UTC+3:30 (IRST)
  - Summer (DST): UTC+4:30 (IRDT)

Patomha (Persian: پاتمها, also Romanized as Pātomhā; also known as Bātamhā, Bātanbā, and Pātomhā Mījān) is a village in Rezvan Rural District, Jebalbarez District, Jiroft County, Kerman Province, Iran. At the 2006 census, its population was 112, in 26 families.
