= Guhrej =

Guhrej گوهرج
- Village
- Location within Iran
- Coordinates: 28°52′53″N 57°50′00″E
- Country: Iran
- Province: Kerman
- County: Jiroft
- Bakhsh: Jebalbarez
- Rural District: Saghder

Population (2006)
  - Total: 94
- Time zone: UTC+3:30 (IRST)
  - Summer (DST): UTC+4:30 (IRDT)

Guhrej (Persian: گوهرج, also Romanized as Gūhrej; also known as Gohrej-e Pā’īn) is a village in Saghder Rural District, Jebalbarez District, Jiroft County, Kerman Province, Iran. At the 2006 census, its population was 94, in 25 families.
