= Dorudgu =

Dorudgu درودگو
- Village
- Location within Iran
- Coordinates: 28°58′30″N 57°54′14″E
- Country: Iran
- Province: Kerman
- County: Jiroft
- Bakhsh: Jebalbarez
- Rural District: Maskun

Population (2006)
  - Total: 98
- Time zone: UTC+3:30 (IRST)
  - Summer (DST): UTC+4:30 (IRDT)

Dorudgu (Persian: درودگو, also Romanized as Dorūdgū; also known as Doroogh Goo’iyeh, Dorūdgū’īyeh, Dorūghgū, and Dorūghgū’īyeh) is a village in Maskun Rural District, Jebalbarez District, Jiroft County, Kerman Province, Iran. At the 2006 census, its population was 98, in 24 families.
