= Godar-e Zard, Kerman =

Godar-e Zard گدارزرد
- Village
- Location within Iran
- Coordinates: 28°54′45″N 57°47′11″E
- Country: Iran
- Province: Kerman
- County: Jiroft
- Bakhsh: Jebalbarez
- Rural District: Saghder

Population (2006)
  - Total: 32
- Time zone: UTC+3:30 (IRST)
  - Summer (DST): UTC+4:30 (IRDT)

Godar-e Zard (Persian: گدارزرد, also Romanized as Godār-e Zard; also known as Godār-e Dow Rad and Godār-e Zard-e Zārīn) is a village in Saghder Rural District, Jebalbarez District, Jiroft County, Kerman Province, Iran. At the 2006 census, its population was 32, in 8 families.

== See also ==
- Gudar people
