= Gavestan =

Gavestan گاوستان
- Village
- Location within Iran
- Coordinates: 28°48′50″N 57°56′11″E
- Country: Iran
- Province: Kerman
- County: Jiroft
- Bakhsh: Jebalbarez
- Rural District: Saghder

Population (2006)
  - Total: 35
- Time zone: UTC+3:30 (IRST)
  - Summer (DST): UTC+4:30 (IRDT)

Gavestan (Persian: گاوستان, also Romanized as Gāvestān; also known as Kārestān and Kāvestān) is a village in Saghder Rural District, Jebalbarez District, Jiroft County, Kerman Province, Iran. At the 2006 census, its population was 35, in 8 families.
