= Gargaz =

Village of Kerman province, Iran

Gargaz گرگاز
- Village
- Location within Iran
- Coordinates: 28°49′34″N 57°54′38″E
- Country: Iran
- Province: Kerman
- County: Jiroft
- Bakhsh: Jebalbarez
- Rural District: Saghder

Population (2006)
  - Total: 178
- Time zone: UTC+3:30 (IRST)
  - Summer (DST): UTC+4:30 (IRDT)

Gargaz (Persian: گرگاز, also Romanized as Gargāz; also known as Korgās and Korgāz) is a village in Saghder Rural District, Jebalbarez District, Jiroft County, Kerman province, Iran. At the 2006 census, its population was 178, in 41 families.

== See also ==
- List of cities in Kerman province by population
- List of cities, towns and villages in Kerman Province
