= Gishkan =

Gishkan گيشكان
- Village
- Location within Iran
- Coordinates: 28°49′42″N 57°51′34″E
- Country: Iran
- Province: Kerman
- County: Jiroft
- Bakhsh: Jebalbarez
- Rural District: Saghder

Population (2006)
  - Total: 16
- Time zone: UTC+3:30 (IRST)
  - Summer (DST): UTC+4:30 (IRDT)

Gishkan (Persian: گيشكان, also Romanized as Gīshkān; also known as Gīshīgān) is a village in Saghder Rural District, Jebalbarez District, Jiroft County, Kerman Province, Iran. At the 2006 census, its population was 16, in 4 families.
