= Deh Darzeh =

Deh Darzeh ده درزه
- Village
- Country: Iran
- Province: Kerman
- County: Jiroft
- Bakhsh: Jebalbarez
- Rural District: Rezvan

Population (2006)
  - Total: 16
- Time zone: UTC+3:30 (IRST)
  - Summer (DST): UTC+4:30 (IRDT)

Deh Darzeh (Persian: ده درزه) is a village in Rezvan Rural District, Jebalbarez District, Jiroft County, Kerman Province, Iran. At the 2006 census, its population was 16, in 4 families.
