= Shirinkenar =

Shirinkenar شيرين كنار
- Village
- Location within Iran
- Coordinates: 28°41′03″N 57°55′47″E
- Country: Iran
- Province: Kerman
- County: Jiroft
- Bakhsh: Jebalbarez
- Rural District: Rezvan

Population (2006)
  - Total: 45
- Time zone: UTC+3:30 (IRST)
  - Summer (DST): UTC+4:30 (IRDT)

Shirinkenar (Persian: شيرين كنار, also Romanized as Shīrīnkenār) is a village in Rezvan Rural District, Jebalbarez District, Jiroft County, Kerman Province, Iran.

According to the 2006 Iranian census, its population consisted of 45 inhabitants from 10 families.
