= Dumar-e Meyani =

Dumar-e Meyani دومارمياني
- Village
- Country: Iran
- Province: Kerman
- County: Jiroft
- Bakhsh: Jebalbarez
- Rural District: Saghder

Population (2006)
  - Total: 98
- Time zone: UTC+3:30 (IRST)
  - Summer (DST): UTC+4:30 (IRDT)

Dumar-e Meyani (Persian: دومارمياني, also Romanized as Dūmār-e Meyānī) is a village in Saghder Rural District, Jebalbarez District, Jiroft County, Kerman Province, Iran. At the 2006 census, its population was 98, in 30 families.
