= Mijan-e Sofla =

Village in Kerman province, Iran

Mijan-e Sofla Persian: میجان سفلی
- Village
- Location within Iran
- Coordinates: 28°42′20″N 57°56′24″E
- Country: Iran
- Province: Kerman
- County: Jiroft
- District: Jebalbarez
- Rural District: Rezvan

Population (2016)
  - Total: 380
- Time zone: UTC+3:30 (IRST)

Mijan-e Sofla (Persian: میجان سفلی) (Note: Also romanized as Mījān-e Soflá; also known as Mījān-e Pā’īn) is a village in, and the capital of, Rezvan Rural District of Jebalbarez District, Jiroft County, Kerman province, Iran.

== Demographics ==
=== Population ===
At the time of the 2006 National Census, the village's population was 94 in 28 households. The following census in 2011 counted 49 people in 19 households. The 2016 census measured the population of the village as 380 people in 110 households.
