= Dumar-e Olya =

Dumar-e Olya بادام
- Village
- Location within Iran
- Coordinates: 28°49′51″N 57°55′51″E
- Country: Iran
- Province: Kerman
- County: Jiroft
- Bakhsh: Jebalbarez
- Rural District: Saghder

Population (2006)
  - Total: 15
- Time zone: UTC+3:30 (IRST)
  - Summer (DST): UTC+4:30 (IRDT)

Dumar-e Olya (Persian: دومارعليا, also Romanized as Dūmār-e ‘Olyā; also known as Do Ghār-e Bālā, Dūmār, and Dūmār-e Bālā) is a village in Saghder Rural District, Jebalbarez District, Jiroft County, Kerman Province, Iran. At the 2006 census, its population was 15, in 5 families.
