= Nadu =

Nadu is a term used to mean land, country, place, domicile, etc. in the Dravidian languages of southern India, north-east Sri Lanka, and south-west Pakistan.

Places with names including Nadu include:

- Tamil Nadu, one of the 28 states of India
- Karnataka, a southwestern Indian state, original appellation Karu Nadu
- Ancient Tamil regions in southern India
  - Chola Nadu
  - Pandiya Nadu
  - Kongu Nadu
  - Tondai Nadu
- City-states in present-day Kerala state, South India
  - Eranad, erstwhile province in Kerala, India
  - Kadathanadu, city-state, feudatory of Kolathunadu
  - Kolathunadu, a former kingdom on the Malabar coast of India
  - Parappanad, medieval Indian city-state
  - Valluvanadu, former Indian kingdom
  - Desinganadu, former name of Kollam/Quilon city in Kerala, India
  - Nanjil Nadu, historical region in the Kanyakumari district in Tamil Nadu, formerly part of Travancore
- Tulu Nadu, Tulu speaking region spread over to parts of present Karnataka and Kerala States of India
- Malayala Nadu are literary terms, which refer to state of Kerala, India
- Malenadu, region of Karnataka, India
- Nadu, Iran, a village in Kerman Province, Iran
- Kamma Nadu or Kammanadu, also Kammarashtra, is a home land of Kammas. Kammanadu is a region encompassing Bellamkonda, Amaravati, Jaggayyapeta, Ongole, Chirala, Bapatla and Narasaraopeta of Guntur, Prakasam and Krishna districts. Reference to Kammarashtra is made by Andhra Ikshvakus in Jaggayyapeta of Krishna district in 3rd century A. D.
- Pakanadu a region corresponding to parts of Prakasam and Nellore Districts of Andhra Pradesh.
- Palnadu is a region in present-day Guntur District of Andhra Pradesh.
- Renadu, a region in Kadapa district.
- Vela Nadu a region in present-day Guntur District of Andhra Pradesh.
- Vengi Nadu or Venginadu or Veginadu, a region originally corresponding to parts of present-day Godavari, Krishna and Visakhapatnam districts.
- Dravida Nadu, also known as Dravidistan or Dravidasthan, was the name of a proposed sovereign state for all non-Brahmin speakers of Dravidian languages in South Asia
