= Dumar-e Sofla =

Dumar-e Sofla دومارسفلي
- Village
- Location within Iran
- Coordinates: 28°49′26″N 57°56′19″E
- Country: Iran
- Province: Kerman
- County: Jiroft
- Bakhsh: Jebalbarez
- Rural District: Saghder

Population (2006)
  - Total: 10
- Time zone: UTC+3:30 (IRST)
  - Summer (DST): UTC+4:30 (IRDT)

Dumar-e Sofla (Persian: دومارسفلي, also Romanized as Dūmār-e Soflá; also known as Do Ghār-e Pā’īn, Dūmār, and Dūmār-e Pā’īn) is a village in Saghder Rural District, Jebalbarez District, Jiroft County, Kerman Province, Iran. At the 2006 census, its population was 10, in 7 families.
