= Dar-e Patak =

Village in Kerman province, Iran

Dar-e Patak Persian: درپتك
- Village
- Location within Iran
- Coordinates: 28°57′12″N 57°53′45″E
- Country: Iran
- Province: Kerman
- County: Jiroft
- District: Jebalbarez
- Rural District: Maskun

Population (2016)
  - Total: 461
- Time zone: UTC+3:30 (IRST)

Dar-e Patak (Persian: درپتك) (Note: Also known as Darb-e Patak) is a village in Maskun Rural District of Jebalbarez District, Jiroft County, Kerman province, Iran.

== Demographics ==
=== Population ===
At the time of the 2006 National Census, the village's population was 115 in 30 households. The following census in 2011 counted 398 people in 115 households. The 2016 census measured the population of the village as 461 people in 140 households. It was the most populous village in its rural district.
