= Galdan (disambiguation) =

Galdan Boshugtu Khan (1644-1697) was a Khan of the Dzungar Khanate.

Galdan may also refer to:

== People ==
- Galdan Chhewang, commander of the Tibeto-Mongol expedition to Ladakh during the Tibet–Ladakh–Mughal War (1679-1684)
- Galdan Tseren (died 1745), Choros-Oirat prince and the Khong Tayiji of the Dzungar Khanate

== Other ==
- Galdan, Iran, a village

== See also ==
- Galdan Namchot, Buddhist festival
