= Gavkan-e Bagh =

Gavkan-e Bagh گاوكان باغ
- Village
- Location within Iran
- Coordinates: 28°58′22″N 57°53′42″E
- Country: Iran
- Province: Kerman
- County: Jiroft
- Bakhsh: Jebalbarez
- Rural District: Maskun

Population (2006)
  - Total: 17
- Time zone: UTC+3:30 (IRST)
  - Summer (DST): UTC+4:30 (IRDT)

Gavkan-e Bagh (Persian: گاوكان باغ, also Romanized as Gāvkān-e Bāgh; also known as Gāvkān Bālā) is a village in Maskun Rural District, Jebalbarez District, Jiroft County, Kerman Province, Iran. At the 2006 census, its population was 17, in 6 families.
