= Gavkan-e Guran =

Gavkan-e Guran گاوكان گوران
- Village
- Location within Iran
- Coordinates: 28°59′00″N 57°53′00″E
- Country: Iran
- Province: Kerman
- County: Jiroft
- Bakhsh: Jebalbarez
- Rural District: Maskun

Population (2006)
  - Total: 154
- Time zone: UTC+3:30 (IRST)
  - Summer (DST): UTC+4:30 (IRDT)

Gavkan-e Guran (Persian: گاوكان گوران, also Romanized as Gāvkān-e Gūrān) is a village in Maskun Rural District, Jebalbarez District, Jiroft County, Kerman Province, Iran. At the 2006 census, its population was 154, in 41 families.
