= Hishin-e Olya =

Hishin-e Olya حشين عليا
- Village
- Location within Iran
- Coordinates: 28°37′07″N 57°56′16″E
- Country: Iran
- Province: Kerman
- County: Jiroft
- Bakhsh: Jebalbarez
- Rural District: Rezvan

Population (2006)
  - Total: 136
- Time zone: UTC+3:30 (IRST)
  - Summer (DST): UTC+4:30 (IRDT)

Hishin-e Olya (Persian: حشين عليا, also Romanized as Ḩīshīn-e ‘Olyā; also known as Ḩīshīn and Moḩammadābād-e Ḩīshīn) is a village in Rezvan Rural District, Jebalbarez District, Jiroft County, Kerman Province, Iran. At the 2006 census, its population was 136, in 33 families.
