= Gardin =

Gardin or Gärdin is a surname. Notable people with the surname include:

- Blanche Gardin (born 1977), French actress, comedian and writer
- Gianfranco Gardin (1944–2024), Italian prelate
- Gianni Berengo Gardin (1930–2025), Italian photographer
- Gösta Gärdin (1923–2015), Swedish modern pentathlete and Olympic medalist
- Kerri Gardin (born 1984), American professional basketball player
- Laura Gardin Fraser (1889–1966), American sculptor
- Ron Gardin (1944–2025), American football player
- Vladimir Gardin (1877–1965), Russian film director

== See also ==
- Gerdin, Iran (disambiguation)
