= Galdan, Iran =

Galdan گلدان
- Village
- Location within Iran
- Coordinates: 28°41′30″N 57°55′15″E
- Country: Iran
- Province: Kerman
- County: Jiroft
- Bakhsh: Jebalbarez
- Rural District: Rezvan

Population (2006)
  - Total: 101
- Time zone: UTC+3:30 (IRST)
  - Summer (DST): UTC+4:30 (IRDT)

Galdan (Persian: گلدان, also Romanized as Galdān; also known as Kaldān) is a village in Rezvan Rural District, Jebalbarez District, Jiroft County, Kerman Province, Iran. At the 2006 census, its population was 101, in 18 families.
