= Saghder =

Village in Kerman province, Iran

Saghder Persian: سغدر
- Village
- Location within Iran
- Coordinates: 28°50′53″N 57°52′10″E
- Country: Iran
- Province: Kerman
- County: Jiroft
- District: Jebalbarez
- Rural District: Saghder

Population (2016)
  - Total: 1,564
- Time zone: UTC+3:30 (IRST)

Saqder Board

Saghder (Persian: سغدر) (Note: Also known as Şaqdar and Saqder) is a village in, and the capital of, Saghder Rural District of Jebalbarez District, Jiroft County, Kerman province, Iran.

== Demographics ==
=== Population ===
At the time of the 2006 National Census, the village's population was 865 in 225 households. The following census in 2011 counted 1,099 people in 342 households. The 2016 census measured the population of the village as 1,564 people in 463 households. It was the most populous village in its rural district.
