= Gerdin =

Gerdin may refer to:

- Viviann Gerdin (born 1944), Swedish politician
- Gerdin, Iran (disambiguation)
