= Gerdin, Jebalbarez =

Gerdin گردين
- Village
- Location within Iran
- Coordinates: 28°50′26″N 57°58′08″E
- Country: Iran
- Province: Kerman
- County: Jiroft
- Bakhsh: Jebalbarez
- Rural District: Saghder

Population (2006)
  - Total: 24
- Time zone: UTC+3:30 (IRST)
  - Summer (DST): UTC+4:30 (IRDT)

Gerdin (Persian: گردين, also Romanized as Gerdīn and Gardīn) is a village in Saghder Rural District, Jebalbarez District, Jiroft County, Kerman Province, Iran. At the 2006 census, its population was 24, in 6 families.
