= Naduiyeh-ye Sofla =

Naduiyeh-ye Sofla ندوئيه سفلي
- Village
- Location within Iran
- Coordinates: 28°37′06″N 57°58′09″E
- Country: Iran
- Province: Kerman
- County: Jiroft
- Bakhsh: Jebalbarez
- Rural District: Rezvan

Population (2006)
  - Total: 39
- Time zone: UTC+3:30 (IRST)
  - Summer (DST): UTC+4:30 (IRDT)

Naduiyeh-ye Sofla (Persian: ندوئيه سفلي, also Romanized as Nadū’īyeh-ye Soflá) is a village in Rezvan Rural District, Jebalbarez District, Jiroft County, Kerman Province, Iran. At the 2006 census, its population was 39, in 10 families.
