= Naduiyeh-ye Miani =

Naduiyeh-ye Miani ندوئيه مياني
- Village
- Location within Iran
- Coordinates: 28°37′02″N 57°58′15″E
- Country: Iran
- Province: Kerman
- County: Jiroft
- Bakhsh: Jebalbarez
- Rural District: Rezvan

Population (2006)
  - Total: 43
- Time zone: UTC+3:30 (IRST)
  - Summer (DST): UTC+4:30 (IRDT)

Naduiyeh-ye Miani (Persian: ندوئيه مياني, also Romanized as Nadū’īyeh-ye Mīānī; also known as Nadūeeyeh) is a village in Rezvan Rural District, Jebalbarez District, Jiroft County, Kerman Province, Iran. At the 2006 census, its population was 43, in 6 families.
