= Name of Tamil Nadu =

- Chola dynasty ruled lands

Chola Nadu

Chera Nadu

Pandiya Nadu

The Name of Tamil Nadu or (Tamil State) refers to the region inhabited by the Tamil people. Since they have the Tamil language as their mother tongue, the term 'Nadu' (meaning 'land' or 'country') signifies the territory where they reside.

== History ==
The history of Tamil Nadu is characterized by ancient civilizations, rich cultural traditions, and significant socio-political achievements. Archaeological evidence and inscriptions serve as vital tools for uncovering this complex past, providing robust proof of the region's distinguished heritage. Various archaeological discoveries—ranging from the urban development at Keezhadi and the Iron Age burial sites at Adichanallur to the maritime trade networks of Kodumanal—have offered a comprehensive understanding of ancient Tamil society. Furthermore, inscriptions—etched in scripts such as Tamil-Brahmi and later writing systems—provide insights into the language, religion, and administrative practices of dynasties like the Pallava nadu, Chola Nadu, Chera nadu, and Pandya Nadu. Thus, the combination of archaeological evidence and written records enables the reconstruction of the historical backdrop of Tamil Nadu.

== Tamil Nadu ==
The term 'Tamil Nadu' has been used for many centuries.

- In the 11th century, Ilampuranar—who wrote the first commentary on the "Tolkappiyam"—used the term "Tamil Nadu" in his commentary (specifically in the phrase: ("num nāṭu yāteṉil tamiḻ nāṭu eṉṟel").
- It is noteworthy that the term "Tamil Nadu" appears in a "Paripadal" verse from the 7th century—specifically in the passage: ("தண்டமிழ் வெளி தமிழ் நாட் டகமெல்லாம் நின்று நிலை இப் புகழ் பூத்த அல்லது குன்றுதல் உண்டோ மதுரை கொடித்தேரான் குன்ற முன் டாகு மளவு").
- The term 'Tamil Nadu' is used in several places throughout the "Silappadikaram". Particularly noteworthy are the lines: ("Then Tamil nadu aalum vendar seruvettu pugalandru elunthu min thavalum imaya nettriyil vilanku virpuliyal poriththa naal")
- During the British colonial period, the capital of the region—known as 'Madrasapattinam'—derived its name from the root term 'Matharasan'. Over time, the region was referred to by various names, including Madrasapattinam, Madras State, and Madras Presidency. Regarding the change of this name, in 1967, the then-Chief minister C. N. Annadurai introduced a resolution in the State Legislative Assembly to rename 'Madras State' to 'Tamil Nadu'—a traditional and historical name. On November 1, 1956, the state was formed under the name 'Madras State'. Following India's independence on August 15, 1947, the 'Madras Presidency' was redesignated as the 'Madras Province'. It is also noteworthy that 'Madras State' was officially established on January 26, 1950.
- In 1914, Bharathiyar participated in a poetry competition in the Madras Presidency with a poem beginning with the lines "Senthamizh Naadenum Podhinile!". He was awarded the second prize, while the first prize went to the Tamil writer A. Maathaiya. Bharathiyar’s poem was later included in the collection titled "Desiya Geethangal" (National Songs) under the heading "Tamil Nadu."

== See also ==
- Cilappatikaram
- Paripāṭal
