= Naduiyeh-ye Olya =

Naduiyeh-ye Olya ندوئيه عليا
- Village
- Location within Iran
- Coordinates: 28°36′58″N 57°59′14″E
- Country: Iran
- Province: Kerman
- County: Jiroft
- Bakhsh: Jebalbarez
- Rural District: Rezvan

Population (2006)
  - Total: 41
- Time zone: UTC+3:30 (IRST)
  - Summer (DST): UTC+4:30 (IRDT)

Naduiyeh-ye Olya (Persian: ندوئيه عليا, also Romanized as Nadū’īyeh-ye ‘Olyā; also known as Nadū and Nadū’īyeh) is a village in Rezvan Rural District, Jebalbarez District, Jiroft County, Kerman Province, Iran. At the 2006 census, its population was 41, in 6 families.
