= Hishin-e Sofla =

Village in Kerman province, Iran

Hishin-e Sofla Persian: حیشین سفلی
- Village
- Location within Iran
- Coordinates: 28°37′13″N 57°56′22″E
- Country: Iran
- Province: Kerman
- County: Jiroft
- District: Jebalbarez
- Rural District: Rezvan

Population (2016)
  - Total: 1,860
- Time zone: UTC+3:30 (IRST)

Hishin-e Sofla (Persian: حیشین سفلی) (Note: Also romanized as Ḩīshīn-e Soflá; also known as Ḩīshīn and Hīshīn) is a village in Rezvan Rural District of Jebalbarez District, Jiroft County, Kerman province, Iran.

== Demographics ==
=== Population ===
At the time of the 2006 National Census, the village's population was 364 in 73 households. The following census in 2011 counted 1,522 people in 380 households. The 2016 census measured the population of the village as 1,860 people in 391 households. It was the most populous village in its rural district.
