= Jebalbarez =

City in Kerman province, Iran

Jebalbarez Persian: جبالبارز
- City
- Location within Iran
- Coordinates: 28°54′29″N 57°53′11″E
- Country: Iran
- Province: Kerman
- County: Jiroft
- District: Jebalbarez

Population (2016)
  - Total: 6,750
- Time zone: UTC+3:30 (IRST)

Jebalbarez (Persian: جبالبارز) (Note: Also romanized as Jebāl Bārez and Jebālbārez; formerly Mohammadabad (محمدآباد)) is a city in, and the capital of, Jebalbarez District of Jiroft County, Kerman province, Iran. It also serves as the administrative center for Maskun Rural District.

== Demographics ==
=== Population ===
At the time of the 2006 National Census, the city's population was 2,639 in 576 households. The following census in 2011 counted 4,416 people in 1,081 households. The 2016 census measured the population of the city as 6,750 people in 1,970 households.
