= Gerdin, Iran =

Gerdin or Gardin (Persian: گردين) in Iran may refer to:

- Gerdin, Jebalbarez
- Gardin, Sarduiyeh
