= Gardin, Sarduiyeh =

Gardin گردين
- Village
- Location within Iran
- Coordinates: 29°14′22″N 57°22′33″E
- Country: Iran
- Province: Kerman
- County: Jiroft
- Bakhsh: Sarduiyeh
- Rural District: Sarduiyeh

Population (2006)
  - Total: 56
- Time zone: UTC+3:30 (IRST)
  - Summer (DST): UTC+4:30 (IRDT)

Gardin (Persian: گردين, also Romanized as Gardīn; also known as Gardān and Gardīn-e Soflá) is a village in Sarduiyeh Rural District, Sarduiyeh District, Jiroft County, Kerman Province, Iran. At the 2006 census, its population was 56, in 14 families.
