= Andhra Ikshvaku =

Indian dynasty (c. 225 – c.340)

Ikshvakus of Andhra
- Early 3rd century–early 4th century
- Location of the Andhra Ikshvakus in c. 350 CE
- Capital: Vijayapuri
- Official languages: Sanskrit
- Religion: Shaivism (Hinduism), Buddhism
- Government: Monarchy
- Maharaja
- History
  - Established: Early 3rd century
  - Conquest of Ikshvakus by Pallava Simhavarman and occupation of Vijayapuri by the Abhiras: early 4th century
Preceded by	Succeeded by
Satavahana dynasty	Pallava Empire; Abhira dynasty
- Today part of: India

The Ikshvaku dynasty (IAST: Ikṣvāku) ruled in the eastern Krishna River valley of India, from their capital at Vijayapuri (modern Nagarjunakonda in Andhra Pradesh) for over a century during 3rd and 4th centuries CE. The Ikshvakus are also known as the Andhra Ikshvakus or the Ikshvakus of Vijayapuri to distinguish them from their legendary namesakes: the Ikshvakus of Kosala.

The Ikshvaku kings were Shaivites and performed Vedic rites, but Buddhism also flourished during their reign. Several Ikshvaku queens and princes contributed to the construction of the Buddhist monuments at present-day Nagarjunakonda.

== Political history ==
Ancient Sanskrit texts, such as Rigveda, Atharvaveda, and Jaiminiya Upanishad Brahmana, mention a legendary king named Ikshvaku (literally, "gourd"). The Atharvaveda and Brahmanas associate the Ikshvakus with non-Aryan people, distinct from the Aryans who composed the hymns of the four Vedas. F. E. Pargiter has equated the ancient Ikshvakus with the Dravidians, however Ramayana and the Puranas, connect the dynasty of Ikshvaku's descendants to Ayodhya, the capital of the Kosala Kingdom in northern India.

A record of the Vijayapuri king Ehuvala Chamtamula traces his ancestry to the legendary Ikshvakus. The Ikshvakus of Vijayapuri seem to be same as the "Shriparvatiya Andhras" mentioned in the Matsya Purana.

=== Chamtamula ===
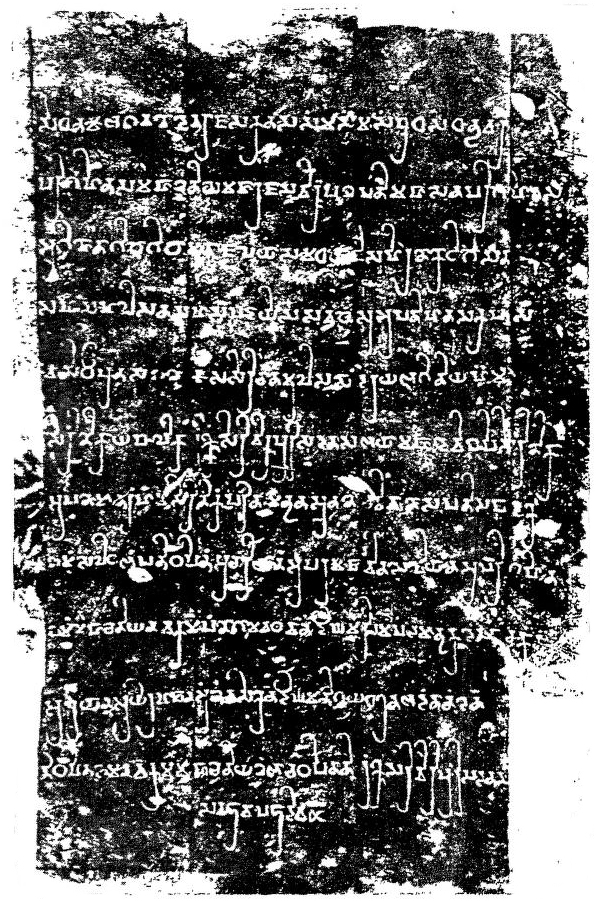
Nagarjunakonda Ayaka pillar inscription of the time of Vira-Purushadatta (250-275 CE)

The dynasty's founder Vasishthiputra Chamtamula (IAST: Vāsiṣṭhīputra Cāṃtamūla; also transliterated Chantamula) rose to power after the decline of the Satavahana power. He is attested by the Rentala and Kesanapalli inscriptions. The Rentala inscription, dated to his 5th regnal year, calls him "Siri Cāṃtamūla". The 4-line Kesanapalli inscription, dated to his 13th regnal year, and inscribed on the pillar of a Buddhist stupa, names him as the founder of the Ikshvaku dynasty.

No information is available about Chamtamula's parents, except that his father had multiple wives and daughters. Chamtamula had two uterine brothers, named Chamtasri (IAST: Cāṃtaśrī) and Hammasri (IAST: Hammaśrī). Chamtasri, who married Mahatalavara Skandashri of Pukiya family (he is Commander-in-chief and a feudatory), played an important role in the construction of a Buddhist mahachaitya.

The records of the later Ikshvaku kings describe Chamtamula as a great performer of the Vedic sacrifices such as Agnishtoma, Vajapeya and Ashvamedha. These descriptions are corroborated by archaeological discoveries, including those of Chamtamula's Ashvamedha-type coins, a tank used for the Avabhritha ceremony, the kurma-chiti (a tortoise-shaped sacrificial altar), and the skeleton of a horse. An inscription of the later Ikshvaku king Ehuvala Chamtamula states that Vasishthiputra Chamtamula won many battles with his valour.

Chamtamula had many wives. His daughter Adavi Chamtisri (IAST: Cāṃtiśrī) married Mahasenapati Mahatalavara Dandanayaka Khamdavishakha (IAST: Khamḍaviśāakha) of the Dhanaka family. He was succeeded by his son Virapurushadatta. An inscription dated to the 20th regnal year of Virapurushadatta mentions Chamtamula's death, which can be interpreted in various ways. It is possible that Chamtamula lived up to this time, having given up the throne at an earlier date; alternatively, it is possible that the inscription merely commemorates his death anniversary.

=== Virapurushadatta ===
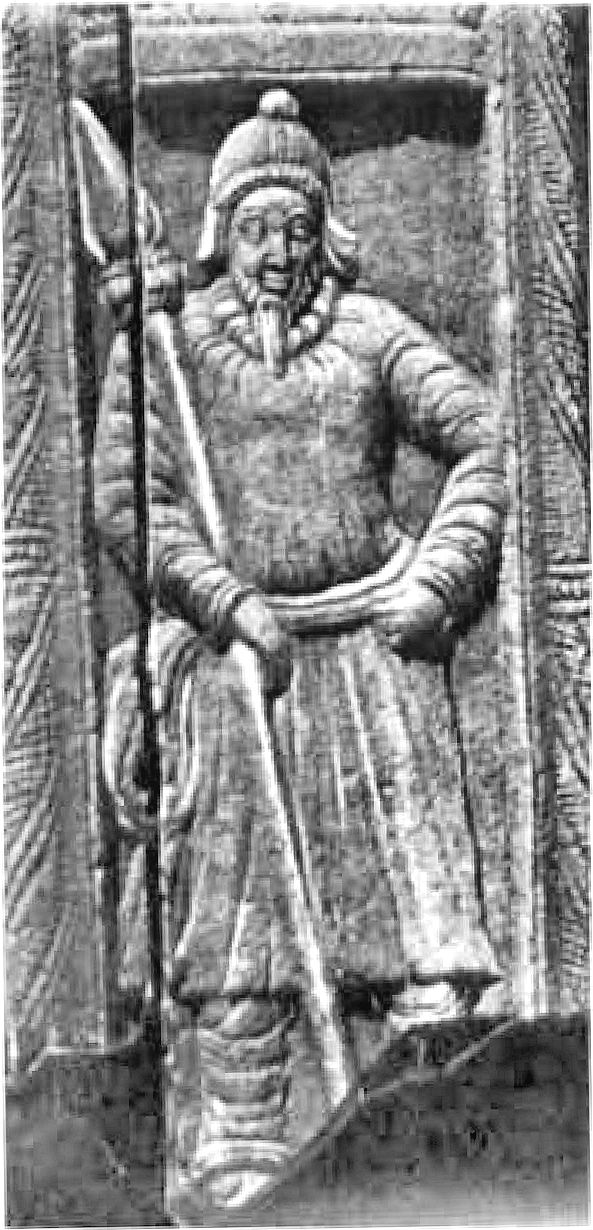
"Scythian" soldier, Nagarjunakonda Palace site.

Mathari-putra Vira-purusha-datta (IAST: Māṭharīputra Vīrapuruṣadatta) ruled for at least 24 years, as he is attested by an inscription dated to his 24th regnal year. He had multiple wives, including three daughters of his paternal aunts (Chamtasri and Hammasri). He also married Rudradhara-bhattarika, the daughter of the ruler of Ujjain (Uj(e)nika mahara(ja) balika), possibly the Indo-Scythian Western Kshatrapa king Rudrasena II. Scythian influence can also be noticed in the Palace of Nagarjunakonda, especially through the reliefs of Scythian soldiers wearing caps and coats. According to an inscription in Nagarjunakonda, a garrison of Scythians guards employed by the Ikshvaku kings may also have been stationed there.

His daughter Kodabalishri (IAST: Kodabaliśrī) married the ruler of the Vanavasa country (possibly the Chutu ruler of modern Banavasi). He had two sons, Eli Ehavuladasa (whose mother was Yakhilinika) and Evuvala Chamtamula (whose mother was Khamduvula, and who succeeded him on the throne).

=== Ehuvala Chamtamula ===
Vasishthi-putra Ehuvala Chamtamula (IAST: Vasiṣṭhīputra Ehuvala Cāṃtamūla) also ruled for at least 24 years, and is attested by inscriptions dated to the regnal years 2, 8, 9, 11, 13, 16 and 24. The Ikshvaku kingdom reached its zenith during his reign. Several Hindu and Buddhist shrines were constructed during his reign. His Patagandigudem inscription is the oldest known copper-plate charter from the Indian subcontinent.

The Ikshvaku kingdom seems to have suffered multiple foreign invasions during Ehuvala's reign. The Sarvadeva temple inscription credits his commander Anikke with victories on the battlefield. The memorial pillar of his general Mahasenapati Chamtapula, a Kulahaka chief, also alludes to battle victories.

Hariti-putra Virapurushadatta, the son of Ehuvala and queen Kapanashri (Kapanaśrī), bore the titles of an heir apparent: Maharaja Kumara and Mahasenapati. However, he did not ascend the throne, probably because he died before his father. Ehuvala was succeeded by Rudrapurushadatta, who was his son from Vammabhatta, the daughter of a Mahakshatrapa (the Western Kshatrapa ruler).

The Shakas (the Western Kshatrapas) appear to have greatly influenced the Ikshvaku kingdom during Ehuvala's rule. Some of the inscriptions issued during this period use the Shaka title svamin for the king. An inscription to commemorate Vammabhatta, issued during the 11th regnal year of his son Rudrapurushadatta uses this title svamin for all the preceding kings.

=== Rudrapurushadatta ===
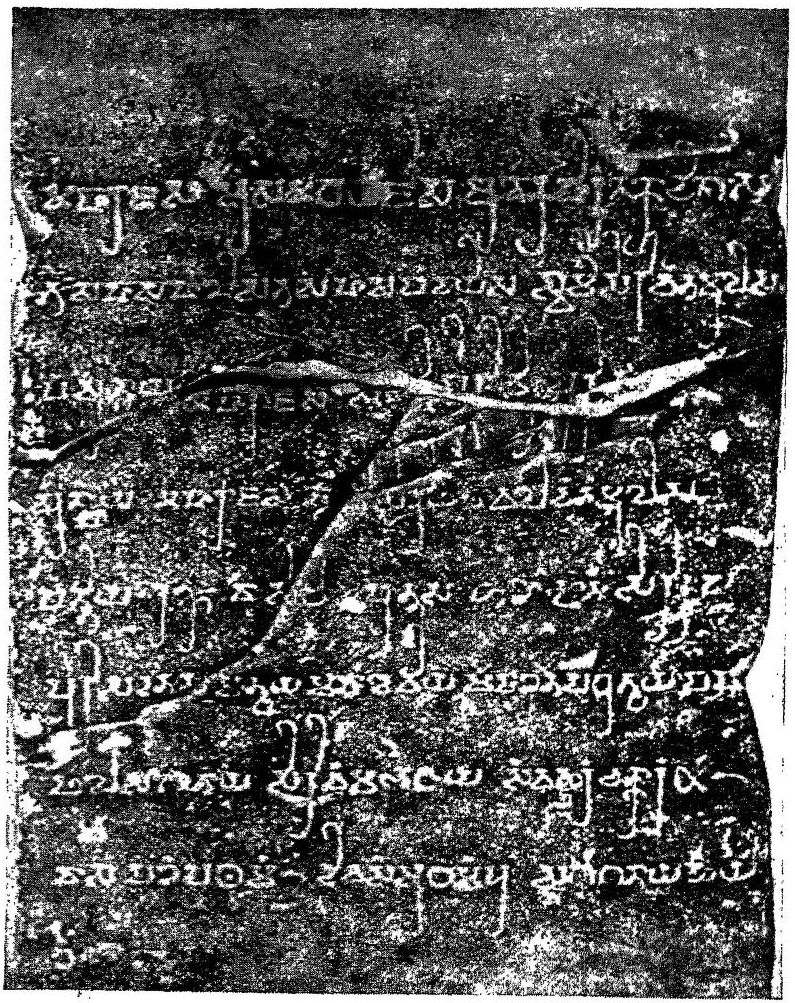
Nagarjunakonda pillar inscription of the time of Rudra-Purushadatta (300-325 CE)

Vasishthi-putra Rudra-purusha-datta (IAST: Vasiṣṭhīputra Rudrapuruṣadatta) is attested by two inscriptions. The Gurazala inscription, dated to his 4th regnal year, records a land grant to the deity Halampura-svamin by Nodu Keshri, for the increase of Keshri's life. The Nagarjunakonda inscription, dated to the 11th regnal year, records the erection of a pillar to commemorate the king's mother Vammabhatta.

According to American academic Richard Salomon "a Nagarjunakonda memorial pillar inscription of the time of King Rudrapurusadatta attests to a marital alliance between the Western Ksatrapas and the Iksvaku rulers of Nagarjunakonda".

=== Decline ===
An inscription dated to the 30th regnal year of the Abhira king Vashishthi-putra Vasusena has been discovered at the ruined Ashtabhuja-svamin temple in Nagarjunakonda. This has led to speculation that the Abhiras, who ruled the region around Nashik, invaded and occupied the Ikshvaku kingdom. However, this cannot be said with certainty.

By the mid-4th century, the Pallavas had gained controlled of the former Ikshvaku territory, and the Ikshvaku rulers may have been reduced to vassal status.

== Rulers ==
Find spots of the Ikshvaku inscriptions

Four Ikshvaku rulers are known from the inscriptions and coins discovered at Nagarjunakonda (IAST names in bracket). The inscriptions of these kings are dated in their regnal years instead of a calendar era, so the exact dates of their reigns are uncertain. Historian K. R. Subramanian assigns Ikshvaku rule to approximately 225-340 CE.

Assuming 227 CE as the last date of the Satavahana king Puloma IV, and assuming that the Ikshvaku rule began immediately after that, scholar K. Krishna Murthy assigns the following dates to the kings, based on their inscriptions:

=== List of rulers ===
The epigraphic evidence from Nagarjunakonda records four main rulers of the Andhra Ikshvaku dynasty. Traditional chronology and the estimates by historian Upinder Singh differ slightly:

- Vāsiṣṭhīputra Cāṃtamūla (c. 227–250 CE; per Upinder Singh: 210–250 CE) — The founder of the independent dynasty following the decline of the Satavahana Empire. He performed the Ashvamedha, Vajapeya, and Agnishtoma sacrifices to legitimize his sovereign rule.
- Māṭharīputra Vīrapuruṣadatta (c. 250–274 CE; per Upinder Singh: 250–275 CE) — Son and successor of Chamtamula. His reign marked a golden age for Buddhism in the Krishna valley, heavily sponsored by royal ladies like Chantisiri. He used strategic matrimonial alliances to secure his frontiers, notably marrying Princess Rudradhara Bhattarika (the daughter of the Saka ruler of Ujjain) to counter the rising military threat of the Abhira dynasty.
- Vasiṣṭhīputra Ehuvala Cāṃtamūla (c. 274–297/300 CE) — Son of Virapurushadatta. His long reign saw the peak of architectural and artistic developments at Vijayapuri (Nagarjunakonda), with the construction of both Buddhist and Brahmanical temples.
- Vasiṣṭhīputra Rudrapuruṣadatta (c. 297–309 CE; per Upinder Singh: 300–325 CE) — The last known sovereign ruler of the main line. Mentioned in an inscription from Gurazala, his reign concluded shortly before the dynasty was conquered and eclipsed by the rising power of the Pallava dynasty.

Historian Upinder Singh estimates the reigns of the Ikshvaku rulers as follows:

- Chamtamula (210–250 CE)
- Virapurushadatta (250–275 CE)
- Ehuvala Chamtamula (275–297/300 CE)
- Rudrapurushadatta (300–325 CE)

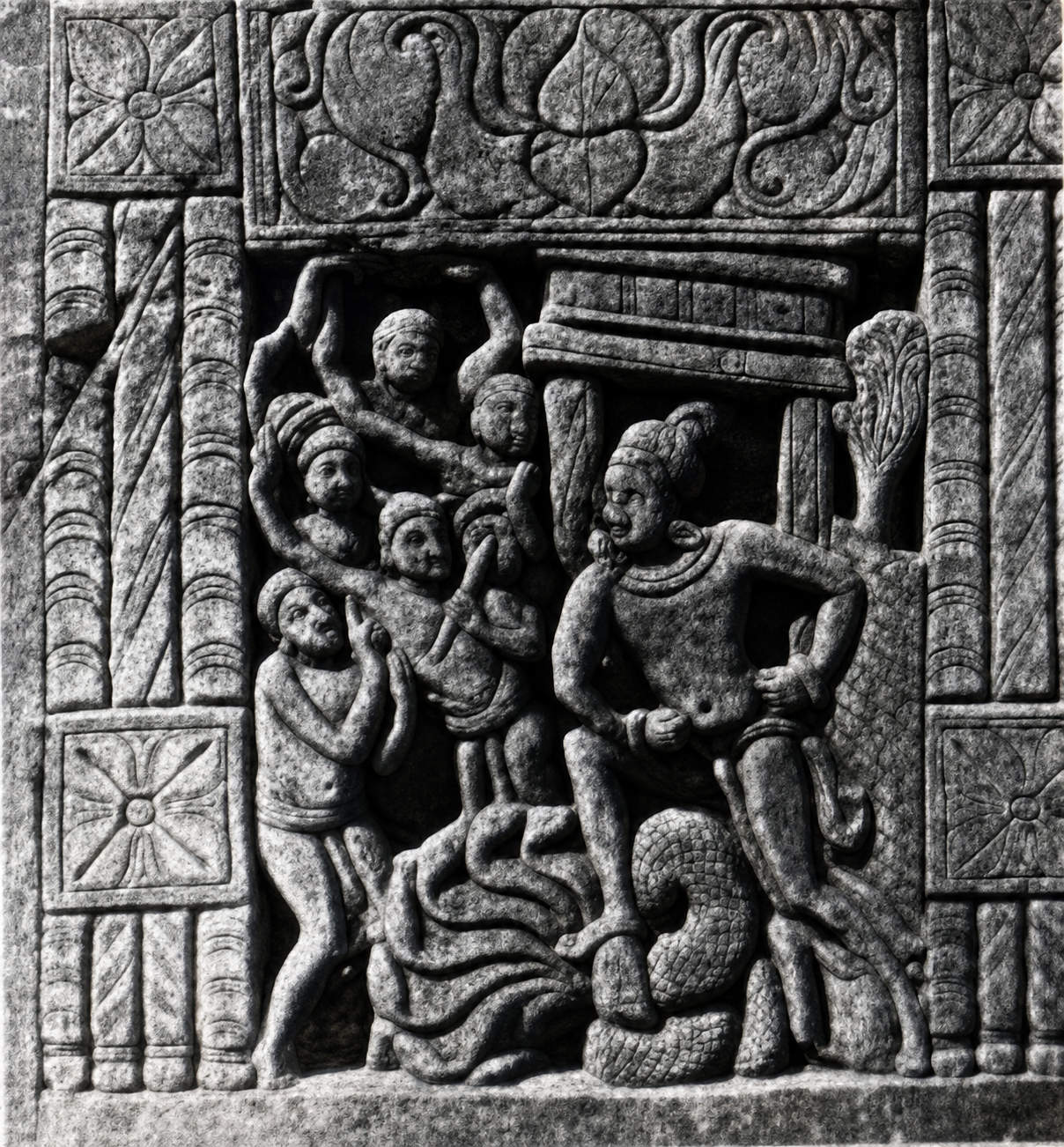
Andhra Ikshvaku king veerapurusha datta sculpture plate from the Nagarjunakonda excavations, depicting the royal court.

== Territory ==
The Ikshvakus ruled parts of present-day Andhra Pradesh and Telangana. Their inscriptions have been discovered at Nagarjunakonda, Jaggayyapeta, Kottampalugu, Gurazala, Rentala, and Uppugunduru.

== Religion ==
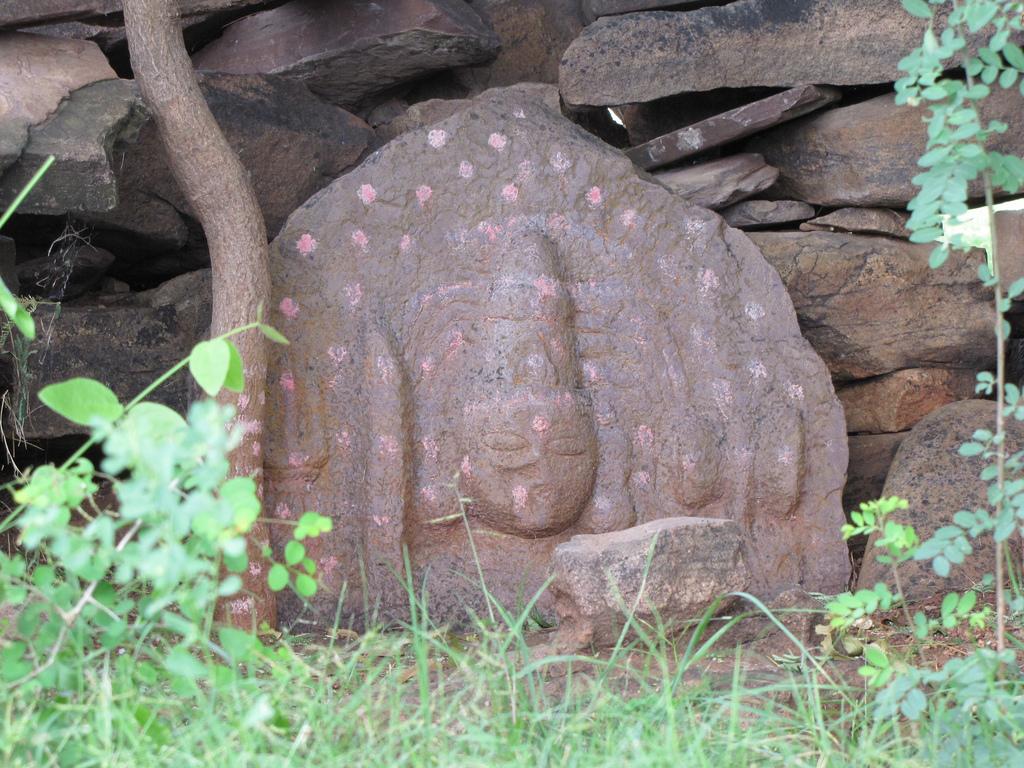
A goddess relief from Nagarjunakonda

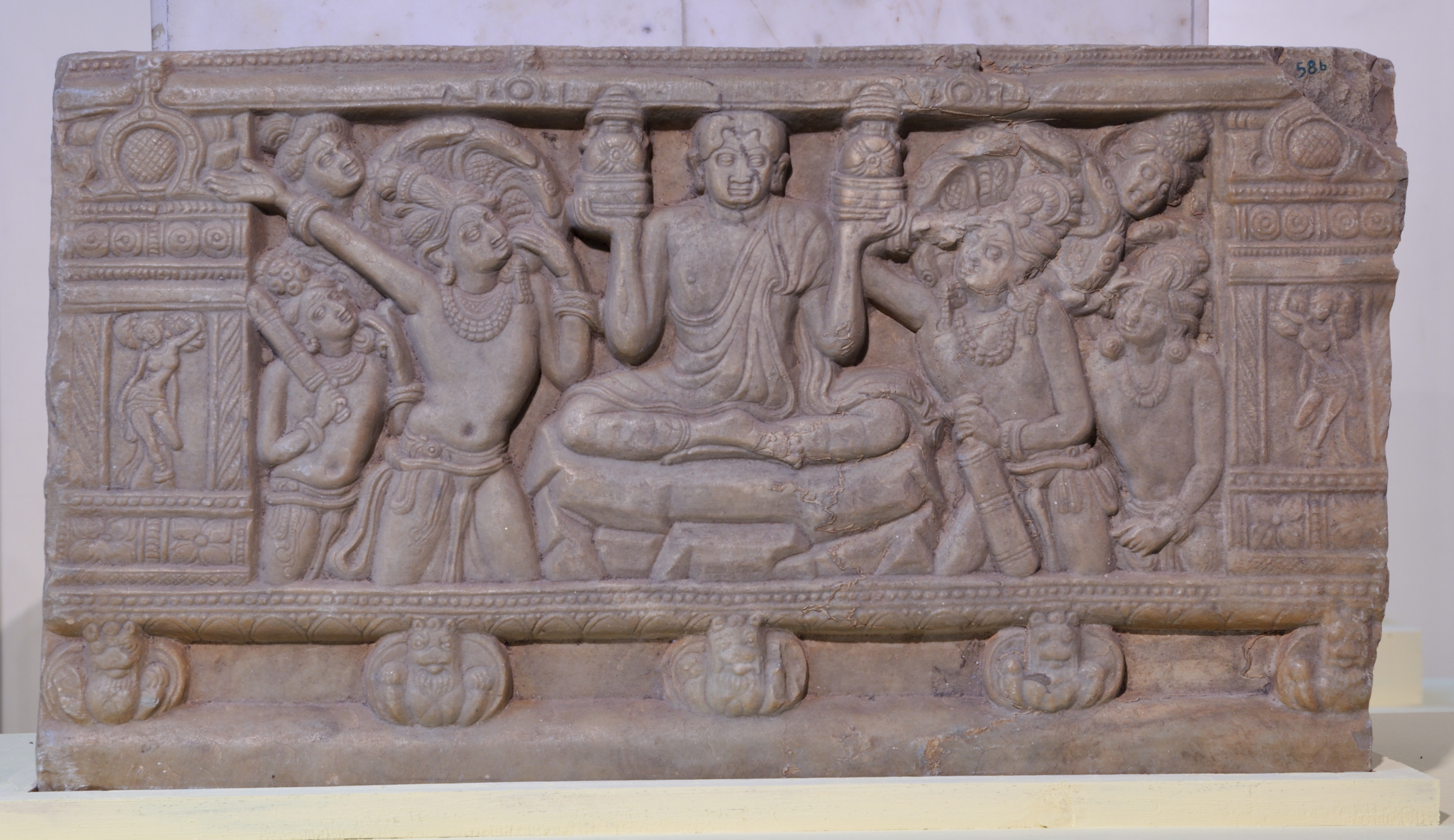
A sculpture from Nagarjunakonda, depicting the division of Buddha Relics

The Ikshvaku kings are known to have performed various Vedic sacrifices. Vasishthiputra Chamtamula performed the Agnishtoma, Vajapeya and Ashvamedha sacrifices. The reign of his grandson Ehuvala Chamtamula saw the rise of Brahmanism, and the construction of several shrines, such as those of Nodagishvara-svamin, Pushpa-bhadra-svamin, and Sarva-deva. The shrine of Sarva-deva ("all gods") was commissioned by his commander Elishri (Eliśrī) during his 11th regnal year. Six or seven versions of an inscription written in metrical Sanskrit were inscribed on its pillars. Prince Haritiputra Virapurushadatta commissioned the Pushpabhadra-savmin temple during the 14th regnal year of Ehuvala. The shrine of Nodagishvara-svamin was also built during Ehuvala's reign, and received a permanent endowment for its maintenance.

Buddhism also flourished in Ikshvaku kingdom, and several princes and queens contributed to the construction of the Buddhist shrines. Chamtashri, the sister of Vasishthiputra Chamtamula, generously donated towards the construction of a mahachaitya ("great chaitya"), which was built during the 6th regnal year of her son-in-law Virapurushadatta, under the supervision of Ananda. A reliquary containing the tooth of Gautama Buddha (according to a local inscription) has been discovered among the ruins of the mahachaitya. According to the Buddhist tradition, the relics were brought by Mahadeva, a missionary sent by the 3rd century BCE Mauryan empire Ashoka to propagate Buddhism.

Inscriptions dated to the regnal years 6, 10, 14, 15, 18, 19, 20, and 24 of Virapurushadatta's rule record the construction of Buddhist monuments by royal ladies and commoners. During the reign of Ehuvala Chamtamula, Mahadevi Bhattideva commissioned a monastery for the teachers of the Bhaushrutiya (Bhauśrutīya) Buddhist sect. Mahadevi Kodabalishri (Kodabaliśrī) commissioned a monastery for the leaders of the Mahishasaka (Mahiśāsaka) sect. Chandrashri (Candraśrī), an upasika performed many religious activities in favour of the Apara-mahavina-seliya sect. A stupa (now termed as Stupa No. 9 at Nagarjunakonda) was renovated during Ehuvala's reign. Kumara-nandin, a merchant, installed an image of Buddha with a Sanskrit inscription during the same period.
