= Maskun Rural District =

Rural district in Kerman province, Iran

Maskun Rural District Persian: دهستان مسكون
- Rural District
- Location within Iran
- Coordinates: 28°54′54″N 57°56′27″E
- Country: Iran
- Province: Kerman
- County: Jiroft
- District: Jebalbarez
- Capital: Jebalbarez

Population (2016)
  - Total: 5,040
- Time zone: UTC+3:30 (IRST)

Maskun Rural District (Persian: دهستان مسكون) is in Jebalbarez District of Jiroft County, Kerman province, Iran. It is administered from the city of Jebalbarez. (Note: Formerly the village of Mohammadabad)

== Demographics ==
=== Population ===
At the time of the 2006 National Census, the rural district's population was 3,290 in 773 households. There were 5,441 inhabitants in 1,510 households at the following census of 2011. The 2016 census measured the population of the rural district as 5,040 in 1,684 households. The most populous of its 143 villages was Dar-e Patak, with 461 people.
