= Rezvan Rural District (Jiroft County) =

Rural district in Kerman province, Iran

Rezvan Rural District Persian: دهستان رضوان
- Rural District
- Location within Iran
- Coordinates: 28°41′45″N 57°57′19″E
- Country: Iran
- Province: Kerman
- County: Jiroft
- District: Jebalbarez
- Capital: Mijan-e Sofla

Population (2016)
  - Total: 5,449
- Time zone: UTC+3:30 (IRST)

Rezvan Rural District (Persian: دهستان رضوان) is in Jebalbarez District of Jiroft County, Kerman province, Iran. Its capital is the village of Mijan-e Sofla.

== Demographics ==
=== Population ===
At the time of the 2006 National Census, the rural district's population was 2,555 in 573 households. There were 5,072 inhabitants in 1,422 households at the following census of 2011. The 2016 census measured the population of the rural district as 5,449 in 1,527 households. The most populous of its 119 villages was Hishin-e Sofla, with 1,860 people.
