= Saghder Rural District =

Rural district in Kerman province, Iran

Saghder Rural District Persian: دهستان سغدر
- Rural District
- Location within Iran
- Coordinates: 28°48′57″N 57°58′59″E
- Country: Iran
- Province: Kerman
- County: Jiroft
- District: Jebalbarez
- Capital: Saghder

Population (2016)
  - Total: 5,898
- Time zone: UTC+3:30 (IRST)

Saghder Rural District (Persian: دهستان سغدر) is in Jebalbarez District of Jiroft County, Kerman province, Iran. Its capital is the village of Saghder.

== Demographics ==
=== Population ===
At the time of the 2006 National Census, the rural district's population was 3,741 in 958 households. There were 4,641 inhabitants in 1,341 households at the following census of 2011. The 2016 census measured the population of the rural district as 5,898 in 1,828 households. The most populous of its 120 villages was Saghder, with 1,564 people.
