= Jebalbarez District =

District in Kerman province, Iran

Jebalbarez District Persian: بخش جبالبارز
- District
- Location within Iran
- Coordinates: 28°48′09″N 57°59′01″E
- Country: Iran
- Province: Kerman
- County: Jiroft
- Capital: Jebalbarez

Population (2016)
  - Total: 23,137
- Time zone: UTC+3:30 (IRST)

Jebalbarez District (Persian: بخش جبالبارز) is in Jiroft County, Kerman province, Iran. Its capital is the city of Jebalbarez.

== Demographics ==
=== Population ===
At the time of the 2006 National Census, the district's population was 12,225 in 2,880 households. The following census in 2011 counted 19,570 people in 5,354 households. The 2016 census measured the population of the district as 23,137 inhabitants in 7,009 households.

=== Administrative divisions ===
Jebalbarez District Population
| Administrative Divisions | 2006 | 2011 | 2016 |
|---|---|---|---|
| Maskun RD | 3,290 | 5,441 | 5,040 |
| Rezvan RD | 2,555 | 5,072 | 5,449 |
| Saghder RD | 3,741 | 4,641 | 5,898 |
| Jebalbarez (city) (Note: Formerly the village of Mohammadabad) | 2,639 | 4,416 | 6,750 |
| Total | 12,225 | 19,570 | 23,137 |
RD = Rural District
