= Gaz =

Gaz may refer to:

== Geography ==
- Gaz, Kyrgyzstan

=== Iran ===
- Gaz, Darmian, village in South Khorasan province
- Gaz, Golestan, a village in Bandar-e Gaz County
- Gaz, Hormozgan, a village in Minab County
- Gaz, Kerman, a village
- Gaz, North Khorasan, a village
- Gaz, Ravar, a village in Kerman province
- Gaz, Sarbisheh, village in South Khorasan province
- Gaz, Semnan, a village in Damghan County
- Gaz-e Borkhar, a city in Isfahan province
- Gaz-e Gharbi, a village in Bandar-e Gaz County, Golestan province
- Gaz-e Lang, a village in Anbarabad County, Kerman province
- Bandar-e-gaz County, Golestan province

== People ==
=== Given name ===
- Gaz Beadle (born 1988), TV actor in Geordie Shore
- Gaz Coombes (born 1976), in the band Supergrass
- Gaz Liddon, British games reviewer

=== Stage name ===
- Gaz, former drummer of Malice Mizer and Baiser

=== Surname ===
- Mohammad Al Gaz, UAE businessman

== Arts, entertainment, and media ==
=== Fictional characters ===
- Gaz (Call of Duty 4), SAS soldier in the 2007 video game
- Kyle "Gaz" Garrick, SAS operator in the 2019 video game Call of Duty: Modern Warfare
- Gaz Bennett, from UK soap opera Hollyoaks
- Gaz Digzy, from the animated series Ballmastrz 9009
- Gaz Wilkinson, in the sitcom Two Pints of Lager and a Packet of Crisps
- Gary "Gaz" Schofield, in the 1997 British comedy The Full Monty

== Businesses and brands ==
- GAZ, the Russian automobile manufacturer Gorkovsky Avtomobilny Zavod
  - GAZ-AA, GAZ-MM, GAZ-built Fords
- Campingaz, bottled gas and paraphernalia previously known as Camping Gaz
- GAZ Geräte- und Akkumulatorenwerk Zwickau, German battery manufacturer

== Other uses ==
- Gaz (candy), Isfahan, Iran
- Gaz (measure) or Guz, Asian or Mughal unit of length

== See also ==
- Do Gaz Zameen Ke Neeche, 1972 Bollywood horror film directed by Tulsi Ramsay
- Gaz de France Stars, tennis tournament held in Hasselt, Belgium
- Gaz Khan, village in Badakhshan Province, Afghanistan
- Les Gaz mortels, 1916 silent French film directed by Abel Gance
- Saint-André-le-Gaz, Isère, France
- Stadionul Inter Gaz, stadium in Popeşti-Leordeni, Romania
- Stadionul Municipal Gaz Metan, stadium in Mediaş, Romania
