= Baghu =

Baghu or Baghoo (Persian: باغو) may refer to:

- Baghu, Golestan
- Baghu Kenareh, Golestan Province
- Baghu, Hormozgan
- Baghu, Bandar Lengeh, Hormozgan Province
- Baghu, Qeshm, Hormozgan Province
- Baghu, alternate name of Baghuiyeh, Sarduiyeh, Kerman Province
- Baghu, alternate name of Baghat, Kerman, Kerman Province
