= Nemch =

Nemch نمچ
- Village
- Location within Iran
- Coordinates: 29°15′27″N 57°20′49″E
- Country: Iran
- Province: Kerman
- County: Jiroft
- Bakhsh: Sarduiyeh
- Rural District: Sarduiyeh

Population (2006)
  - Total: 98
- Time zone: UTC+3:30 (IRST)
  - Summer (DST): UTC+4:30 (IRDT)

Nemch (Persian: نمچ, also Romanized as Namch; also known as Namsh, Nemj, and Nemsh) is a village in Sarduiyeh Rural District, Sarduiyeh District, Jiroft County, Kerman Province, Iran. At the 2006 census, its population was 98, in 24 families.

== See also ==
- Bab Deraz
- Barb-e Behesht
- Sinabad, Kerman
