= Bab Deraz =

Bab Deraz باب دراز
- Village
- Location within Iran
- Coordinates: 29°15′53″N 57°20′34″E
- Country: Iran
- Province: Kerman
- County: Jiroft
- Bakhsh: Sarduiyeh
- Rural District: Sarduiyeh

Population (2006)
  - Total: 351
- Time zone: UTC+3:30 (IRST)
  - Summer (DST): UTC+4:30 (IRDT)

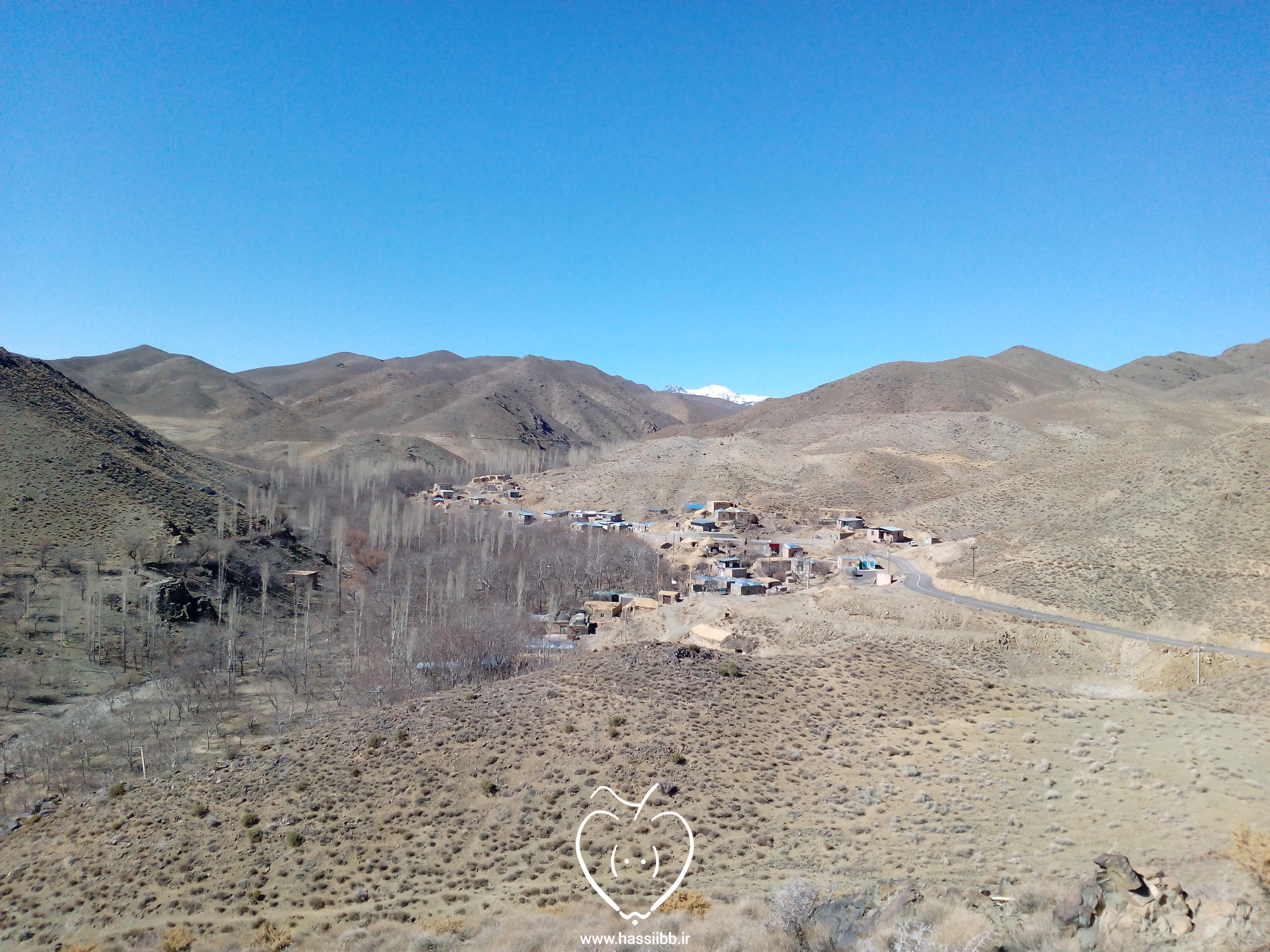

Bab Deraz (Persian: باب دراز, also Romanized as Bāb Derāz) is a village in Sarduiyeh Rural District, Sarduiyeh District, Jiroft County, Kerman Province, Iran. At the 2006 census, its population was 351, in 50 families.

== See also ==
- Nemch
- Barb-e Behesht
- Sinabad, Kerman
