= Livan =

Livan may refer to:

== People ==
- LIVAN, a UK-based alternative rock trio
- Liván Hernández (born 1975), Cuban baseball player
- Liván López (born 1982), Cuban wrestler
- Livan Valdez (born 1988), Cuban professional basketball player
- Liván Taboada (born 1998), Cuban volleyball player
- Liván Soto (born 2000), Venezuelan baseball player
- Liván Osoria (born 1994), Cuban volleyball player
- Livan Burcu (born 2004), footballer
- Liván Moinelo (born 1995), Cuban baseball player
- Liván Taboada (born 1998), Cuban volleyball player

== Places ==
- Lebanon
- Livan, East Azerbaijan, a village in East Azerbaijan Province, Iran
- Livan-e Gharbi, a village in Golestan Province, Iran
- Livan-e Sharqi, a village in Golestan Province, Iran
- Livan Rural District, in Golestan Province, Iran

== Other uses ==
- Livan Automotive, a Chinese car manufacturer
- Livan (band), UK-based alternative rock band
