= Gevar =

Gevar (Persian: گور), also rendered as Givr, may refer to:

- Gevar-e Olya, Iran
- Gevar-e Sofla, Iran
- Gevar Rural District, Iran
- Yüksekova, Turkey

Gevar (Danish)

- Gevar is a Danish king in book III of the Gesta Danorum
