= Baghuiyeh =

Baghuiyeh or Baghueeyeh (Persian: باغوئيه) may refer to:

- Baghuiyeh, Baft
- Baghuiyeh, Gevar, Jiroft County
- Baghuiyeh, Sarduiyeh, Jiroft County
- Baghuiyeh, Rabor
