= Nahr Kemal =

Village in Kerman, Iran

Nahr Kemal نهركمال (اسفارچ )
- Village
- Location within Iran
- Coordinates: 29°15′12″N 57°11′49″E
- Country: Iran
- Province: Kerman
- County: Jiroft
- Bakhsh: Sarduiyeh
- Rural District: Sarduiyeh

Population (2006)
  - Total: 462
- Time zone: UTC+3:30 (IRST)
  - Summer (DST): UTC+4:30 (IRDT)

Nahr Kemal (Persian: نهركمال (اسفارچ ), also Romanized as Nahr Kemāl; also known as Esfārch) is a village in Sarduiyeh Rural District, Sarduiyeh District, Jiroft County, Kerman Province, Iran. At the 2006 census, its population was 462, in 113 families.
