= Hoseynabad, Bandar-e Gaz =

Village in Golestan province, Iran

Hoseynabad Persian: حسين آباد
- Village
- Location within Iran
- Coordinates: 36°46′26″N 53°59′55″E
- Country: Iran
- Province: Golestan
- County: Bandar-e Gaz
- District: Central
- Rural District: Anzan-e Sharqi

Population (2016)
  - Total: 714
- Time zone: UTC+3:30 (IRST)

Hoseynabad (Persian: حسين اباد) (Note: Also romanized as Ḩoseynābād) is a village in Anzan-e Sharqi Rural District of the Central District in Bandar-e Gaz County, Golestan province, Iran.

== Demographics ==
=== Population ===
At the time of the 2006 National Census, the village's population was 688 in 148 households. The following census in 2011 counted 724 people in 197 households. The 2016 census measured the population of the village as 714 people in 207 households.
