= Damaneh, Kerman =

روستای دامنه ساردوئیه دامنه
- village
- Damane
- Location within Iran
- Coordinates: 29°13′49″N 57°13′30″E
- Country: Iran
- Province: Kerman
- County: Jiroft
- Bakhsh: Sarduiyeh
- Rural District: Sarduiyeh

Population (2016)
  - Total: 800
- Time zone: UTC+3:30 (IRST)
  - Summer (DST): UTC+4:30 (IRDT)

Damaneh (Persian: دامنه, also Romanized as Dāmaneh) is a village in Sarduiyeh Rural District, Sarduiyeh District, Jiroft County, Kerman Province, Iran. At the 2006 census, its population was 430, in 74 families.
