= Mohammadabad, Bandar-e Gaz =

Village in Golestan province, Iran

Mohammadabad Persian: محمداباد
- Village
- Location within Iran
- Coordinates: 36°47′28″N 54°00′52″E
- Country: Iran
- Province: Golestan
- County: Bandar-e Gaz
- District: Central
- Rural District: Anzan-e Sharqi

Population (2016)
  - Total: 269
- Time zone: UTC+3:30 (IRST)

Mohammadabad (Persian: محمداباد) (Note: Also romanized as Moḩammadābād) is a village in Anzan-e Sharqi Rural District of the Central District in Bandar-e Gaz County, Golestan province, Iran.

== Demographics ==
=== Population ===
At the time of the 2006 National Census, the village's population was 237 in 53 households. The following census in 2011 counted 303 people in 84 households. The 2016 census measured the population of the village as 269 people in 82 households.
