= Jafa Kandeh =

Village in Golestan province, Iran

Jafa Kandeh Persian: جفاكنده
- Village
- Location within Iran
- Coordinates: 36°44′08″N 53°56′04″E
- Country: Iran
- Province: Golestan
- County: Bandar-e Gaz
- District: Now Kandeh
- Rural District: Banafsheh Tappeh

Population (2016)
  - Total: 920
- Time zone: UTC+3:30 (IRST)

Jafa Kandeh (Persian: جفاكنده) (Note: Also romanized as Jafā Kandeh) is a village in, and the capital of, Banafsheh Tappeh Rural District in Now Kandeh District of Bandar-e Gaz County, Golestan province, Iran. The rural district was previously administered from the city of Now Kandeh.

== Demographics ==
=== Population ===
At the time of the 2006 National Census, the village's population was 1,099 in 292 households. The following census in 2011 counted 1,121 people in 333 households. The 2016 census measured the population of the village as 920 people in 311 households. It was the most populous village in its rural district.
