= Vatana =

Village in Golestan province, Iran

Vatana Persian: وطنا
- Village
- Location within Iran
- Coordinates: 36°42′58″N 53°58′04″E
- Country: Iran
- Province: Golestan
- County: Bandar-e Gaz
- District: Central
- Rural District: Anzan-e Gharbi

Population (2016)
  - Total: 364
- Time zone: UTC+3:30 (IRST)

Vatana (Persian: وطنا) (Note: Also romanized as Vaţanā, Vaţanā’, and Vaţnā‘) is a village in Anzan-e Gharbi Rural District (Note: Formerly Anzan Rural District) of the Central District in Bandar-e Gaz County, Golestan province, Iran.

== Demographics ==
=== Population ===
At the time of the 2006 National Census, the village's population was 305 in 82 households. The following census in 2011 counted 354 people in 111 households. The 2016 census measured the population of the village as 364 people in 128 households.
