= Kar Kondeh, Golestan =

Village in Golestan province, Iran

Kar Kondeh Persian: كاركنده
- Village
- Location within Iran
- Coordinates: 36°45′41″N 54°02′09″E
- Country: Iran
- Province: Golestan
- County: Bandar-e Gaz
- District: Central
- Rural District: Anzan-e Sharqi

Population (2016)
  - Total: 941
- Time zone: UTC+3:30 (IRST)

Kar Kondeh (Persian: كاركنده) (Note: Also romanized as Kār Kandeh and Kār Kondeh) is a village in Anzan-e Sharqi Rural District of the Central District in Bandar-e Gaz County, Golestan province, Iran.

== Demographics ==
=== Population ===
At the time of the 2006 National Census, the village's population was 1,088 in 273 households. The following census in 2011 counted 924 people in 283 households. The 2016 census measured the population of the village as 941 people in 321 households.
