= Seh Cheshmeh =

Seh Cheshmeh and Seh Chashmeh and Sehcheshmeh (Persian: سه چشمه) may refer to:

- Seh Cheshmeh, Kerman
- Seh Cheshmeh, Kermanshah
