= Deh-e Rud Musevi =

Deh-e Rud Musevi ده رودموسوي
- Village
- Country: Iran
- Province: Kerman
- County: Jiroft
- Bakhsh: Sarduiyeh
- Rural District: Dalfard

Population (2006)
  - Total: 66
- Time zone: UTC+3:30 (IRST)
  - Summer (DST): UTC+4:30 (IRDT)

Deh-e Rud Musevi (Persian: ده رودموسوي, also Romanized as Deh-e Rūd Mūsevī) is a village in Dalfard Rural District, Sarduiyeh District, Jiroft County, Kerman Province, Iran. At the 2006 census, its population was 66, in 12 families.
