= Zamin Sarv =

Zamin Sarv زمين سرو
- Village
- Location within Iran
- Coordinates: 29°04′16″N 57°47′12″E
- Country: Iran
- Province: Kerman
- County: Jiroft
- Bakhsh: Sarduiyeh
- Rural District: Gevar

Population (2006)
  - Total: 120
- Time zone: UTC+3:30 (IRST)
  - Summer (DST): UTC+4:30 (IRDT)

Zamin Sarv (Persian: زمين سرو, also Romanized as Zamīn Sarv) is a village in Gevar Rural District, Sarduiyeh District, Jiroft County, Kerman Province, Iran. At the 2006 census, its population was 120, in 30 families.
