= Babidan =

Babidan بابيدان
- Village
- Location within Iran
- Coordinates: 29°06′18″N 57°33′06″E
- Country: Iran
- Province: Kerman
- County: Jiroft
- Bakhsh: Sarduiyeh
- Rural District: Gevar

Population (2006)
  - Total: 109
- Time zone: UTC+3:30 (IRST)
  - Summer (DST): UTC+4:30 (IRDT)

Babidan (Persian: بابيدان, also Romanized as Bābīdān; also known as Sangdān, Sarbizān, and Sar Bostān) is a village in Gevar Rural District, Sarduiyeh District, Jiroft County, Kerman Province, Iran. At the 2006 census, its population was 109, in 23 families.
