= Bagh Ahmad =

Bagh Ahmad باغ احمد
- Village
- Location within Iran
- Coordinates: 29°02′13″N 57°37′06″E
- Country: Iran
- Province: Kerman
- County: Jiroft
- Bakhsh: Sarduiyeh
- Rural District: Dalfard

Population (2006)
  - Total: 37
- Time zone: UTC+3:30 (IRST)
  - Summer (DST): UTC+4:30 (IRDT)

Bagh Ahmad (Persian: باغ احمد, also Romanized as Bāgh Aḩmad) is a village in Dalfard Rural District, Sarduiyeh District, Jiroft County, Kerman Province, Iran. At the 2006 census, its population was 37, in 7 families.
