= Sar Mahalleh =

Village in Golestan province, Iran

Sar Mahalleh Persian: سرمحله
- Village
- Location within Iran
- Coordinates: 36°45′16″N 54°00′01″E
- Country: Iran
- Province: Golestan
- County: Bandar-e Gaz
- District: Central
- Rural District: Anzan-e Sharqi

Population (2016)
  - Total: 430
- Time zone: UTC+3:30 (IRST)

Sar Mahalleh (Persian: سرمحله) (Note: Also romanized as Sar Maḩalleh) is a village in Anzan-e Sharqi Rural District of the Central District in Bandar-e Gaz County, Golestan province, Iran.

== Demographics ==
=== Population ===
At the time of the 2006 National Census, the village's population was 581 in 145 households. The following census in 2011 counted 557 people in 160 households. The 2016 census measured the population of the village as 430 people in 152 households.
