= Bagh-e Ebrahim =

Bagh-e Ebrahim باغ ابراهيم
- Village
- Location within Iran
- Coordinates: 29°14′30″N 57°08′13″E
- Country: Iran
- Province: Kerman
- County: Jiroft
- Bakhsh: Sarduiyeh
- Rural District: Sarduiyeh

Population (2006)
  - Total: 110
- Time zone: UTC+3:30 (IRST)
  - Summer (DST): UTC+4:30 (IRDT)

Bagh-e Ebrahim (Persian: باغ ابراهيم, also Romanized as Bāgh-e Ebrāhīm) is a village in Sarduiyeh Rural District, Sarduiyeh District, Jiroft County, Kerman Province, Iran. At the 2006 census, its population was 110, in 15 families.
