= Kohneh Kolbad =

Village in Golestan province, Iran

Kohneh Kolbad Persian: كهنه كلباد
- Village
- Location within Iran
- Coordinates: 36°43′55″N 53°51′56″E
- Country: Iran
- Province: Golestan
- County: Bandar-e Gaz
- District: Now Kandeh
- Rural District: Livan

Population (2016)
  - Total: 318
- Time zone: UTC+3:30 (IRST)

Kohneh Kolbad (Persian: كهنه كلباد) (Note: Also romanized as Kohneh Kālbād and Kohneh Kolbād) is a village in Livan Rural District of Now Kandeh District in Bandar-e Gaz County, Golestan province, Iran.

== Demographics ==
=== Population ===
At the time of the 2006 National Census, the village's population was 339 in 84 households. The following census in 2011 counted 311 people in 94 households. The 2016 census measured the population of the village as 318 people in 108 households.
