= Sar Taq =

Sar Taq or Sartaq (Persian: سرطاق) may refer to:

- Sartaq, Golestan
- Sar Taq, Lorestan
- Sar Taq, Markazi
