= Valfara =

Village in Golestan province, Iran

Valfara Persian: ولفرا
- Village
- Location within Iran
- Coordinates: 36°44′54″N 53°59′19″E
- Country: Iran
- Province: Golestan
- County: Bandar-e Gaz
- District: Central
- Rural District: Anzan-e Gharbi

Population (2016)
  - Total: 344
- Time zone: UTC+3:30 (IRST)

Valfara (Persian: ولفرا) (Note: Also romanized as Valfarā) is a village in Anzan-e Gharbi Rural District (Note: Formerly Anzan Rural District) of the Central District in Bandar-e Gaz County, Golestan province, Iran.

== Demographics ==
=== Population ===
At the time of the 2006 National Census, the village's population was 328 in 86 households. The following census in 2011 counted 367 people in 106 households. The 2016 census measured the population of the village as 344 people in 118 households.
