= Banafsh Tappeh =

Village in Golestan province, Iran

Banafsh Tappeh Persian: بنفش تپه
- Village
- Location within Iran
- Coordinates: 36°42′15″N 53°54′51″E
- Country: Iran
- Province: Golestan
- County: Bandar-e Gaz
- District: Now Kandeh
- Rural District: Banafsheh Tappeh

Population (2016)
  - Total: 300
- Time zone: UTC+3:30 (IRST)

Banafsh Tappeh (Persian: بنفش تپه) (Note: Also romanized as Banafsh Teppeh) is a village in Banafsheh Tappeh Rural District of Now Kandeh District in Bandar-e Gaz County, Golestan province, Iran.

== Demographics ==
=== Population ===
At the time of the 2006 National Census, the village's population was 445 in 130 households. The following census in 2011 counted 333 people in 112 households. The 2016 census measured the population of the village as 300 people in 117 households.
