= Qaleh, Kerman =

Qaleh قلعه
- Village
- Location within Iran
- Coordinates: 28°56′53″N 57°39′23″E
- Country: Iran
- Province: Kerman
- County: Jiroft
- Bakhsh: Sarduiyeh
- Rural District: Dalfard

Population (2006)
  - Total: 126
- Time zone: UTC+3:30 (IRST)
  - Summer (DST): UTC+4:30 (IRDT)

Qaleh (Persian: قلعه, also Romanized as Qal‘eh; also known as Qal‘eh Pīrmoḩammadī) is a village in Dalfard Rural District, Sarduiyeh District, Jiroft County, Kerman Province, Iran. At the 2006 census, its population was 126, in 27 families.
