= Konarestan-e Sofla =

Konarestan-e Sofla كنارستان سفلي
- Village
- Location within Iran
- Coordinates: 28°55′00″N 57°41′00″E
- Country: Iran
- Province: Kerman
- County: Jiroft
- Bakhsh: Sarduiyeh
- Rural District: Dalfard

Population (2006)
  - Total: 137
- Time zone: UTC+3:30 (IRST)
  - Summer (DST): UTC+4:30 (IRDT)

Konarestan-e Sofla (Persian: كنارستان سفلي, also Romanized as Konārestān-e Soflá; also known as Konārestān) is a village in Dalfard Rural District, Sarduiyeh District, Jiroft County, Kerman Province, Iran. At the 2006 census, its population was 137, in 28 families.
