= Talur, Golestan =

Village in Golestan province, Iran

Talur Persian: تلور
- Village
- Location within Iran
- Coordinates: 36°43′52″N 53°53′31″E
- Country: Iran
- Province: Golestan
- County: Bandar-e Gaz
- District: Now Kandeh
- Rural District: Livan

Population (2016)
  - Total: 1,067
- Time zone: UTC+3:30 (IRST)

Talur (Persian: تلور) (Note: Also romanized as Talūr, Tālūr, and Tolūr; also known as Talūz and Tel Nār) is a village in Livan Rural District of Now Kandeh District in Bandar-e Gaz County, Golestan province, Iran.

== Demographics ==
=== Population ===
At the time of the 2006 National Census, the village's population was 1,173 in 324 households. The following census in 2011 counted 1,171 people in 369 households. The 2016 census measured the population of the village as 1,067 people in 370 households.
