= Bab Torsh =

Bab Torsh بابترش
- Village
- Location within Iran
- Coordinates: 29°18′09″N 57°24′30″E
- Country: Iran
- Province: Kerman
- County: Jiroft
- Bakhsh: Sarduiyeh
- Rural District: Sarduiyeh

Population (2006)
  - Total: 151
- Time zone: UTC+3:30 (IRST)
  - Summer (DST): UTC+4:30 (IRDT)

Bab Torsh (Persian: بابترش, also Romanized as Bāb Torsh and Bāb-e Torsh; also known as Darreh Torsh and Darreh Tursh) is a village in Sarduiyeh Rural District, Sarduiyeh District, Jiroft County, Kerman Province, Iran.

In the 2006 census, its population was 151, with 20 families.
