= Navi-ye Shest =

Navi-ye Shest ناوي شصت
- village
- Country: Iran
- Province: Kerman
- County: Jiroft
- Bakhsh: Sarduiyeh
- Rural District: Gevar

Population (2006)
  - Total: 17
- Time zone: UTC+3:30 (IRST)
  - Summer (DST): UTC+4:30 (IRDT)

Navi-ye Shest (Persian: ناوي شصت, also Romanized as Nāvī-ye Sheṣt) is a village in Gevar Rural District, Sarduiyeh District, Jiroft County, Kerman Province, Iran. At the 2006 census, its population was seventeen, in five families.
