= Suteh Deh =

Village in Golestan province, Iran

Suteh Deh Persian: سوته ده
- Village
- Location within Iran
- Coordinates: 36°45′09″N 54°01′35″E
- Country: Iran
- Province: Golestan
- County: Bandar-e Gaz
- District: Central
- Rural District: Anzan-e Sharqi

Population (2016)
  - Total: 397
- Time zone: UTC+3:30 (IRST)

Suteh Deh (Persian: سوته ده) (Note: Also romanized as Sūteh Deh) is a village in Anzan-e Sharqi Rural District of the Central District in Bandar-e Gaz County, Golestan province, Iran.

== Demographics ==
=== Population ===
At the time of the 2006 National Census, the village's population was 471 in 109 households. The following census in 2011 counted 440 people in 120 households. The 2016 census measured the population of the village as 397 people in 127 households.
