= Gol Afra =

Village in Golestan province, Iran

Gol Afra Persian: گل افرا
- Village
- Location within Iran
- Coordinates: 36°45′02″N 54°01′03″E
- Country: Iran
- Province: Golestan
- County: Bandar-e Gaz
- District: Central
- Rural District: Anzan-e Sharqi

Population (2016)
  - Total: 668
- Time zone: UTC+3:30 (IRST)

Gol Afra (Persian: گل افرا) (Note: Also romanized as Gol Afrā; also known as Gol Farā) is a village in, and the capital of, Anzan-e Sharqi Rural District in the Central District of Bandar-e Gaz County, Golestan province, Iran.

== Demographics ==
=== Population ===
At the time of the 2006 National Census, the village's population was 723 in 176 households. The following census in 2011 counted 760 people in 215 households. The 2016 census measured the population of the village as 668 people in 223 households.
