= Estunabad =

Village in Golestan province, Iran

Estunabad Persian: استون اباد
- Village
- Location within Iran
- Coordinates: 36°42′45″N 53°56′29″E
- Country: Iran
- Province: Golestan
- County: Bandar-e Gaz
- District: Now Kandeh
- Rural District: Banafsheh Tappeh

Population (2016)
  - Total: 552
- Time zone: UTC+3:30 (IRST)

Estunabad (Persian: استون اباد) (Note: Also romanized as Estūnābād; also known as Estīnavā and Estīnovā) is a village in Banafsheh Tappeh Rural District of Now Kandeh District in Bandar-e Gaz County, Golestan province, Iran.

== Demographics ==
=== Population ===
At the time of the 2006 National Census, the village's population was 570 in 151 households. The following census in 2011 counted 573 people in 170 households. The 2016 census measured the population of the village as 552 people in 182 households.
