= Kuh Sahra =

Village in Golestan province, Iran

Kuh Sahra Persian: كوه صحرا
- Village
- Location within Iran
- Coordinates: 36°44′55″N 53°58′33″E
- Country: Iran
- Province: Golestan
- County: Bandar-e Gaz
- District: Central
- Rural District: Anzan-e Gharbi

Population (2016)
  - Total: 332
- Time zone: UTC+3:30 (IRST)

Kuh Sahra (Persian: كوه صحرا) (Note: Also romanized as Kūh Şaḩrā and Kūh-e Şaḩrā) is a village in Anzan-e Gharbi Rural District (Note: Formerly Anzan Rural District) of the Central District in Bandar-e Gaz County, Golestan province, Iran.

== Demographics ==
=== Population ===
At the time of the 2006 National Census, the village's population was 426 in 107 households. The following census in 2011 counted 349 people in 104 households. The 2016 census measured the population of the village as 332 people in 109 households.
