= Dashti Kalateh =

Dashti Kalateh or Dashti Kola or Dasht Kalateh (Persian: دشتي كلاته) may refer to:

- Dashti Kalateh-ye Gharbi
- Dashti Kalateh-ye Sharqi
