= Bagu =

Bagu may refer to:

- Bagu language, an Australian language
- Baghu (disambiguation), several places in Iran
- Baghuiyeh (disambiguation), several places in Iran
- Sergio Bagú (1911–2002), Argentinian historian
- Delta Aurigae, a star also named Bagu

== See also ==
- Bagoo (disambiguation)
