= Kechengan =

Kechengan كچنگان
- Village
- Location within Iran
- Coordinates: 29°06′00″N 57°43′00″E
- Country: Iran
- Province: Kerman
- County: Jiroft
- Bakhsh: Sarduiyeh
- Rural District: Gevar

Population (2006)
  - Total: 30
- Time zone: UTC+3:30 (IRST)
  - Summer (DST): UTC+4:30 (IRDT)

Kechengan (Persian: كچنگان, also Romanized as Kechengān) is a village in Gevar Rural District, Sarduiyeh District, Jiroft County, Kerman Province, Iran. At the 2006 census, its population was 30, in 11 families.
