= Dashti Kalateh-ye Gharbi =

Village in Golestan province, Iran

Dashti Kalateh-ye Gharbi Persian: دشتي كلاته غربي
- Village
- Location within Iran
- Coordinates: 36°44′21″N 53°56′47″E
- Country: Iran
- Province: Golestan
- County: Bandar-e Gaz
- District: Central
- Rural District: Anzan-e Gharbi

Population (2016)
  - Total: 454
- Time zone: UTC+3:30 (IRST)

Dashti Kalateh-ye Gharbi (Persian: دشتي كلاته غربي) (Note: Also romanized as Dashtī Kalāteh-ye Gharbī; also known as Dasht Kalāteh-ye Gharbī) is a village in Anzan-e Gharbi Rural District (Note: Formerly Anzan Rural District) of the Central District in Bandar-e Gaz County, Golestan province, Iran.

== Demographics ==
=== Population ===
At the time of the 2006 National Census, the village's population was 532 in 141 households. The following census in 2011 counted 548 people in 172 households. The 2016 census measured the population of the village as 454 people in 166 households.
