= Bagoo =

Bagooo' may refer to:

- Bagoo (Empire of Dreams), a fictional character
- Bagoo, Zahedan, a village in Iran

== See also ==
- Bagu (disambiguation)
