= Baghat, Iran =

Baghat (Persian: باغات) may refer to:

- Baghat, Hormozgan
- Baghat, Kerman
