= Seh Cheshmeh, Kerman =

Seh Cheshmeh سه چشمه
- Village
- Location within Iran
- Coordinates: 29°14′56″N 57°13′05″E
- Country: Iran
- Province: Kerman
- County: Jiroft
- Bakhsh: Sarduiyeh
- Rural District: Sarduiyeh

Population (2006)
  - Total: 145
- Time zone: UTC+3:30 (IRST)
  - Summer (DST): UTC+4:30 (IRDT)

Seh Cheshmeh (Persian: سه چشمه, also Romanized as Seh Chashmeh; also known as Sar Cheshmeh) is a village in Sarduiyeh Rural District, Sarduiyeh District, Jiroft County, Kerman Province, Iran. At the 2006 census, its population was 145, in 23 families.
