= Darrehi =

Village in Kerman province, Iran

Darrehi Persian: دره اي
- Village
- Location within Iran
- Coordinates: 28°52′27″N 57°43′06″E
- Country: Iran
- Province: Kerman
- County: Jiroft
- District: Sarduiyeh
- Rural District: Dalfard

Population (2016)
  - Total: 817
- Time zone: UTC+3:30 (IRST)

Darrehi (Persian: دره اي) (Note: Also romanized as Darreh’ī; also known as Areh, Arreh, and Darreh) is a village in Dalfard Rural District of Sarduiyeh District, Jiroft County, Kerman province, Iran.

== Demographics ==
=== Population ===
At the time of the 2006 National Census, the village's population was 398 in 74 households. The following census in 2011 counted 789 people in 191 households. The 2016 census measured the population of the village as 817 people in 361 households. It was the most populous village in its rural district.
