= Livan-e Gharbi =

Village in Golestan province, Iran

Livan-e Gharbi Persian: ليوان غربي
- Village
- Location within Iran
- Coordinates: 36°44′00″N 53°52′27″E
- Country: Iran
- Province: Golestan
- County: Bandar-e Gaz
- District: Now Kandeh
- Rural District: Livan

Population (2016)
  - Total: 1,229
- Time zone: UTC+3:30 (IRST)

Livan-e Gharbi (Persian: ليوان غربي) (Note: Also romanized as Līvān Gharbī and Līvān-e Gharbī; also known as Lītvān and Līvān) is a village in Livan Rural District of Now Kandeh District in Bandar-e Gaz County, Golestan province, Iran.

== Demographics ==
=== Population ===
At the time of the 2006 National Census, the village's population was 1,496 in 398 households. The following census in 2011 counted 1,409 people in 426 households. The 2016 census measured the population of the village as 1,229 people in 415 households.
