= Sartaq, Golestan =

Village in Golestan province, Iran

Sartaq Persian: سرطاق
- Village
- Location within Iran
- Coordinates: 36°45′21″N 54°00′28″E
- Country: Iran
- Province: Golestan
- County: Bandar-e Gaz
- District: Central
- Rural District: Anzan-e Sharqi

Population (2016)
  - Total: 667
- Time zone: UTC+3:30 (IRST)

Sartaq (Persian: سرطاق) (Note: Also romanized as Sarţāq; also known as Sarţān) is a village in Anzan-e Sharqi Rural District of the Central District in Bandar-e Gaz County, Golestan province, Iran.

== Demographics ==
=== Population ===
At the time of the 2006 National Census, the village's population was 668 in 172 households. The following census in 2011 counted 691 people in 194 households. The 2016 census measured the population of the village as 667 people in 218 households.
