= Raziabad, Sarduiyeh =

Village in Kerman province, Iran

Raziabad Persian: رضي اباد
- Village
- Location within Iran
- Coordinates: 28°56′46″N 57°39′28″E
- Country: Iran
- Province: Kerman
- County: Jiroft
- District: Sarduiyeh
- Rural District: Dalfard

Population (2016)
  - Total: 56
- Time zone: UTC+3:30 (IRST)

Raziabad (Persian: رضي اباد) (Note: Also romanized as Raẕīābād and Razīābād; also known as Qal’eh-ye Zarābād) is a village in, and the capital of, Dalfard Rural District of Sarduiyeh District, Jiroft County, Kerman province, Iran.

== Demographics ==
=== Population ===
At the time of the 2006 National Census, the village's population was 100 in 17 households. The following census in 2011 counted 49 people in 13 households. The 2016 census measured the population of the village as 56 people in 24 households.
