= Beheshti =

Beheshti (Persian: بهشتي) may refer to:

== People ==
- Mohammad Beheshti, one of the main architects of Iranian Islamic Revolution and the constitution of the Islamic Republic in Iran who was assassinated in 1981
- Sattar Beheshti, Iranian blogger who died in police custody in November 2012

== Places ==
- Beheshti, Kerman

== See also ==
- Bahishti Zewar, a book by Indian Islamic scholar Ashraf Ali Thanwi
