= Sar Tapeh Castle =

Castle in Golestan Province, Iran

Sar Tapeh castle
- قلعه سرتپه

General information
- Type: Castle
- Location: Bandar-e Gaz County, Iran

Sar Tapeh castle (Persian: قلعه سرتپه) is a historical castle located in Bandar-e Gaz County in Golestan Province.
