= Qalatuiyeh, Jiroft =

Village in Kerman province, Iran

Qalatuiyeh Persian: قلاتوييه
- Village
- Location within Iran
- Coordinates: 29°13′07″N 57°26′31″E
- Country: Iran
- Province: Kerman
- County: Jiroft
- District: Sarduiyeh
- Rural District: Gevar

Population (2016)
  - Total: 200
- Time zone: UTC+3:30 (IRST)

Qalatuiyeh (Persian: قلاتوييه) (Note: Also romanized as Qalātū’īyeh; also known as Kalato, Kalātū, and Qalātū) is a village in, and the former capital of, Gevar Rural District of Sarduiyeh District, Jiroft County, Kerman province, Iran. The capital of the rural district has been transferred to the village of Sahebabad.

== Demographics ==
=== Population ===
At the time of the 2006 National Census, the village's population was 193 in 44 households. The following census in 2011 counted 334 people in 91 households. The 2016 census measured the population of the village as 200 people in 70 households.
