= Dashti Kalateh-ye Sharqi =

Village in Golestan province, Iran

Dashti Kalateh-ye Sharqi Persian: دشتي كلاته شرقي
- Village
- Location within Iran
- Coordinates: 36°44′25″N 53°57′25″E
- Country: Iran
- Province: Golestan
- County: Bandar-e Gaz
- District: Central
- Rural District: Anzan-e Gharbi

Population (2016)
  - Total: 509
- Time zone: UTC+3:30 (IRST)

Dashti Kalateh-ye Sharqi (Persian: دشتي كلاته شرقي) (Note: Also romanized as Dashtī Kalāteh-ye Sharqī; also known as Dasht Kalāteh-ye Sharqī) is a village in Anzan-e Gharbi Rural District (Note: Formerly Anzan Rural District) of the Central District in Bandar-e Gaz County, Golestan province, Iran.

== Demographics ==
=== Population ===
At the time of the 2006 National Census, the village's population was 666 in 153 households. The following census in 2011 counted 564 people in 174 households. The 2016 census measured the population of the village as 509 people in 169 households.
