= Gaz-e Gharbi =

Village in Golestan province, Iran

Gaz-e Gharbi Persian: گز غربي
- Village
- Location within Iran
- Coordinates: 36°44′26″N 53°57′50″E
- Country: Iran
- Province: Golestan
- County: Bandar-e Gaz
- District: Central
- Rural District: Anzan-e Gharbi

Population (2016)
  - Total: 1,883
- Time zone: UTC+3:30 (IRST)

Gaz-e Gharbi (Persian: گزغربي) (Note: Also romanized as Gaz-e Gharbī; also known as Gaz) is a village in, and the capital of, Anzan-e Gharbi Rural District (Note: Formerly Anzan Rural District) in the Central District of Bandar-e Gaz County, Golestan province, Iran. The previous capital of the rural district was the village of Now Kandeh, now a city.

== Demographics ==
=== Population ===
At the time of the 2006 National Census, the village's population was 2,317 in 604 households. The following census in 2011 counted 2,239 people in 689 households. The 2016 census measured the population of the village as 1,883 people in 628 households. It was the most populous village in its rural district.
