= Gaz, Golestan =

Village in Golestan province, Iran

Gaz Persian: گز
- Village
- Location within Iran
- Coordinates: 36°44′29″N 53°58′12″E
- Country: Iran
- Province: Golestan
- County: Bandar-e Gaz
- District: Central
- Rural District: Anzan-e Gharbi

Population (2016)
  - Total: 1,276
- Time zone: UTC+3:30 (IRST)

Gaz (Persian: گز) (Note: Also known as Gaz-e Sharqī) is a village in Anzan-e Gharbi Rural District (Note: Formerly Anzan Rural District) of the Central District in Bandar-e Gaz County, Golestan province, Iran.

== Demographics ==
=== Population ===
At the time of the 2006 National Census, the village's population was 1,445 in 368 households. The following census in 2011 counted 1,416 people in 404 households. The 2016 census measured the population of the village as 1,276 people in 422 households.
