= Baghu, Golestan =

Village in Golestan province, Iran

Baghu Persian: باغو
- Village
- Location within Iran
- Coordinates: 36°45′13″N 54°01′49″E
- Country: Iran
- Province: Golestan
- County: Bandar-e Gaz
- District: Central
- Rural District: Anzan-e Sharqi

Population (2016)
  - Total: 662
- Time zone: UTC+3:30 (IRST)

Baghu (Persian: باغو) (Note: Also romanized as Bāghū; also known as Bāqū) is a village in Anzan-e Sharqi Rural District of the Central District in Bandar-e Gaz County, Golestan province, Iran.

== Demographics ==
=== Population ===
At the time of the 2006 National Census, the village's population was 653 in 173 households. The following census in 2011 counted 665 people in 195 households. The 2016 census measured the population of the village as 662 people in 218 households.
