= Baghu Kenareh =

Village in Golestan province, Iran

Baghu Kenareh Persian: باغو كناره
- Village
- Location within Iran
- Coordinates: 36°47′32″N 54°01′54″E
- Country: Iran
- Province: Golestan
- County: Bandar-e Gaz
- District: Central
- Rural District: Anzan-e Sharqi

Population (2016)
  - Total: 1,242
- Time zone: UTC+3:30 (IRST)

Baghu Kenareh (Persian: باغوكناره) (Note: Also romanized as Bāghū Kenāreh) is a village in Anzan-e Sharqi Rural District of the Central District in Bandar-e Gaz County, Golestan province, Iran.

== Demographics ==
=== Population ===
At the time of the 2006 National Census, the village's population was 1,209 in 301 households. The following census in 2011 counted 1,281 people in 356 households. The 2016 census measured the population of the village as 1,242 people in 371 households. It was the most populous village in its rural district.
