= Darreh Rud =

Darreh Rud or Darrehrud (Persian: دره رود) may refer to:

- Darreh Rud, Baft, Kerman Province
- Darreh Rud, Jiroft, Kerman Province

== See also ==
- Rud Darreh
