= Livan-e Sharqi =

Village in Golestan province, Iran

Livan-e Sharqi Persian: ليوان شرقي
- Village
- Location within Iran
- Coordinates: 36°44′00″N 53°53′04″E
- Country: Iran
- Province: Golestan
- County: Bandar-e Gaz
- District: Now Kandeh
- Rural District: Livan

Population (2016)
  - Total: 2,240
- Time zone: UTC+3:30 (IRST)

Livan-e Sharqi (Persian: ليوان شرقي) (Note: Also romanized as Līvān-e Sharqī) is a village in, and the capital of, Livan Rural District in Now Kandeh District of Bandar-e Gaz County, Golestan province, Iran.

== Demographics ==
=== Population ===
At the time of the 2006 National Census, the village's population was 2,410 in 683 households. The following census in 2011 counted 2,413 people in 793 households. The 2016 census measured the population of the village as 2,240 people in 757 households. It was the most populous village in its rural district.
