= Sahebabad, Jiroft =

Village in Kerman province, Iran

Sahebabad Persian: صاحب‌آباد
- Village
- Location within Iran
- Coordinates: 29°06′44″N 57°32′22″E
- Country: Iran
- Province: Kerman
- County: Jiroft
- District: Sarduiyeh
- Rural District: Gevar

Population (2016)
  - Total: 317
- Time zone: UTC+3:30 (IRST)

Sahebabad (Persian: صاحب‌آباد) (Note: Also romanized as Şāḩebābād; also known as Sa‘bābād and Şāḩebābād-e Sar Bīzhan) is a village in, and the capital of, Gevar Rural District of Sarduiyeh District, Jiroft County, Kerman province, Iran. The previous capital of the rural district was the village of Qalatuiyeh.

== Demographics ==
=== Population ===
At the time of the 2006 National Census, the village's population was 218 in 35 households. The following census in 2011 counted 382 people in 106 households. The 2016 census measured the population of the village as 317 people in 136 households.
