= Gevar-e Olya =

Gevar-e Olya گورعليا
- Village
- Location within Iran
- Coordinates: 29°10′45″N 57°42′23″E
- Country: Iran
- Province: Kerman
- County: Jiroft
- Bakhsh: Sarduiyeh
- Rural District: Gevar

Population (2006)
  - Total: 440
- Time zone: UTC+3:30 (IRST)
  - Summer (DST): UTC+4:30 (IRDT)

Gevar-e Olya (Persian: گورعليا, also Romanized as Gevar-e ‘Olyā; also known as Gevar, Gevar-e Bālā, and Givr) is a village in Gevar Rural District, Sarduiyeh District, Jiroft County, Kerman Province, Iran. At the 2006 census, its population was 440, in 126 families.
