= Baghuiyeh, Sarduiyeh =

Baghuyeh باغوئيه
- Village
- Location within Iran
- Coordinates: 29°19′07″N 57°10′11″E
- Country: Iran
- Province: Kerman
- County: Jiroft
- Bakhsh: Sarduiyeh
- Rural District: Sarduiyeh

Population (2006)
  - Total: 63
- Time zone: UTC+3:30 (IRST)
  - Summer (DST): UTC+4:30 (IRDT)

Baghuyeh (Persian: باغوئيه, also Romanized as Bāghū’īyeh; also known as Baghoo, Bāghū, Bāghūyeh, and Bāgu) is a village in Sarduiyeh Rural District, Sarduiyeh District, Jiroft County, Kerman Province, Iran. As of the 2006 census, its population was 63, in 13 families.
