= Darreh Rud, Jiroft =

Village in Kerman province, Iran

Darreh Rud Persian: دره رود
- Village
- Location within Iran
- Coordinates: 29°16′31″N 57°10′22″E
- Country: Iran
- Province: Kerman
- County: Jiroft
- District: Sarduiyeh
- Rural District: Sarduiyeh

Population (2016)
  - Total: 792
- Time zone: UTC+3:30 (IRST)

Darreh Rud (Persian: دره رود) (Note: Also romanized as Darreh Rūd) is a village in Sarduiyeh Rural District of Sarduiyeh District, Jiroft County, Kerman province, Iran.

== Demographics ==
=== Population ===
At the time of the 2006 National Census, the village's population was 790 in 152 households. The following census in 2011 counted 850 people in 196 households. The 2016 census measured the population of the village as 792 people in 251 households. It was the most populous village in its rural district.
