= Bochemie =

Czech electro-chemical company

Bochemie a.s.
- Company type: Private
- Industry: Chemicals
- Founded: 2024
- Headquarters: Bohumín, Czech Republic
- Website: www.bochemie.cz

Bochemie a.s. is an electro-chemical company based in Bohumín, Czech Republic. It produces a wide range of products used for wood protection, metal surface treatment or disinfection, as well as smart textiles.

== History ==
=== 1904–1938 ===
Bochemie's predecessor, Österreichisches Chemikalienwerk Rudolf Goldschmidt & Co., was founded in 1904, originally to produce aniline dyes. When a significant sugar shortage set in during World War I, Goldschmidt founded the Oderberger Chemische Werke, or Bohumín Chemical Works, together with Saccharin A.G., the largest producer of saccharin in Austria-Hungary. Saccharin A.G. remained an important shareholder, to whom Bohumín Chemical Works also handed over 40 percent of its profits as royalties for applied technologies.

The company was nevertheless very profitable, given that in the interwar period, saccharin was sold at a cartel price set by the Czechoslovak government, which was relatively high compared to the cost of production. Bohumín Chemical Works could thus afford to invest in diversifying production, which gradually expanded to include a broad range of basic chemicals, pharmaceuticals and horticultural, agricultural and photographic products. The company's product list from 1936 comprises more than 250 items.

The company's development was severely hampered by the economic crisis of the 1920s, which pushed it to the brink of bankruptcy and resulted in a dramatic reduction in the number of employees. After a thorough restructuring, the company was profitable again in 1925, but the effort to establish a subsidiary plant in Kraków, Poland, had to be abandoned in 1930.

=== 1939–present ===
Shortly after the collapse of Czechoslovakia, Nový Bohumín and with it the chemical plant was occupied by Polish troops who were replaced by German soldiers in September 1939. In 1940, the plant was confiscated, and a commissary manager was appointed, before it was sold off to two German companies. After the war, the Bohumín Chemical Works first passed into direct government administration, before it was included into a broader nationalization of the Czechoslovak chemical industry which started in October 1945.

After the Velvet Revolution, the plant was privatized in 1991, becoming a joint stock company and adopting the name Bochemie Bohumín. During the 1990s, Bochemie established several subsidiaries, including branches in Slovakia and Poland, or bought stakes in a number of companies operating in related fields. At the turn of the millennium, the consolidation of the entire multinational group, since then known as the Bochemie Group, was completed. Important milestones in the company's history also include the acquisition of the Saxon industrial batteries and battery storage systems manufacturer GAZ Geräte- und Akkumulatorenwerk Zwickau in 2019. However, in January 2025, GAZ was spun off into GAZ Energy a.s., a sister company of Bochemie a.s. within the Bochemie Group.

== Production portfolio ==
For the first two decades or so after its foundation, Bohumín Chemical Works focused mainly on the production of zinc paints and saccharin. During the interwar period, the plant also prepared chloramine, artificial shellac, or aspirin, among many other products. Since the 1960s until present day, the Bohumín plant produces the metal surface treatment agent Feropur, or the Bochemit range of wood impregnation and protection agents. In 1973, Savo was introduced, a disinfectant for household use which quickly became widely popular across several Eastern Bloc countries. In 2013, the brand was acquired by Unilever but is being still produced by Bochemie.

Active materials for batteries have been added to the portfolio in 1951, and since 2020, the plant produces complete electrode plates for GAZ' nickel-cadmium batteries. Other fields of the group's activity include producing both professional and consumer-grade disinfectants, or metallizing textiles using Bochemie's proprietary MEFTEX technology.
