= Sinabad, Kerman =

Sinabad سين اباد
- Village
- Location within Iran
- Coordinates: 29°13′47″N 57°19′00″E
- Country: Iran
- Province: Kerman
- County: Jiroft
- Bakhsh: Sarduiyeh
- Rural District: Sarduiyeh

Population (2006)
  - Total: 439
- Time zone: UTC+3:30 (IRST)
  - Summer (DST): UTC+4:30 (IRDT)

Sinabad (Persian: سين اباد, also Romanized as Sīnābād; also known as Deh Zobeydeh, Zobeydeh, and Zubīdeh) is a village in Sarduiyeh Rural District, Sarduiyeh District, Jiroft County, Kerman Province, Iran. At the 2006 census, its population was 439, in 82 families.
