= Anzan-e Sharqi Rural District =

Rural district in Golestan province, Iran

Anzan-e Sharqi Rural District Persian: دهستان انزان شرقی
- Rural District
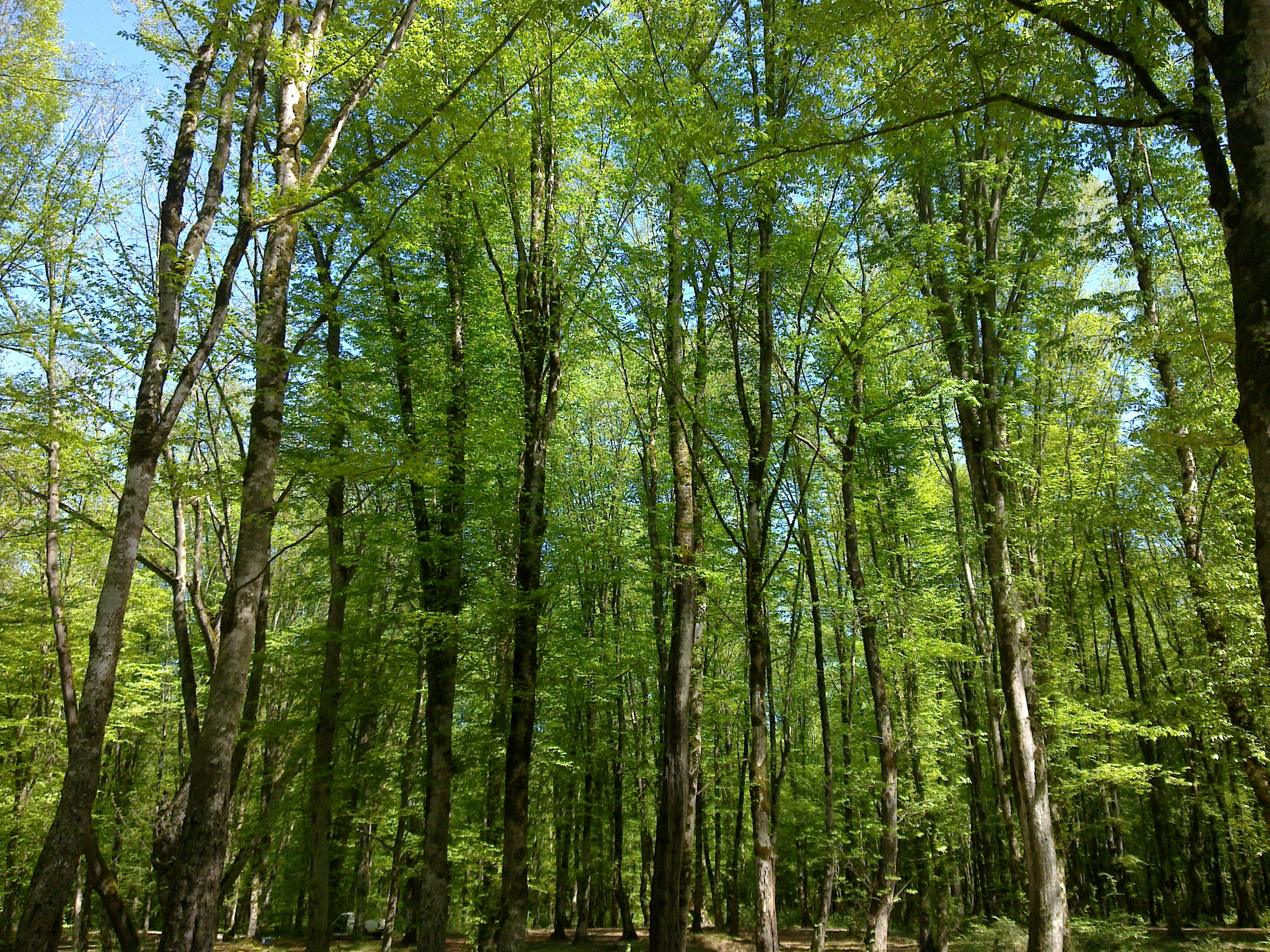
- Hyrcanian forests near Baghu

- Location within Iran
- Coordinates: 36°44′N 54°01′E
- Country: Iran
- Province: Golestan
- County: Bandar-e Gaz
- District: Central
- Established: 1997
- Capital: Gol Afra

Population (2016)
  - Total: 6,950
- Time zone: UTC+3:30 (IRST)

Anzan-e Sharqi Rural District (Persian: دهستان انزان شرقی) is in the Central District of Bandar-e Gaz County, Golestan province, Iran. Its capital is the village of Gol Afra.

== Demographics ==
=== Population ===
At the time of the 2006 National Census, the rural district's population was 7,101 in 1,718 households. There were 7,258 inhabitants in 2,047 households at the following census of 2011. The 2016 census measured the population of the rural district as 6,950 in 2,216 households. The most populous of its 10 villages was Baghu Kenareh, with 1,242 people.

=== Other villages in the rural district ===
- Baghu
- Ebrahimabad
- Hoseynabad
- Kar Kondeh
- Mohammadabad
- Sar Mahalleh
- Sartaq
- Suteh Deh
