= Gevar-e Sofla =

Village in Kerman province, Iran

Gevar-e Sofla Persian: گور سفلی
- Village
- Location within Iran
- Coordinates: 29°10′03″N 57°42′37″E
- Country: Iran
- Province: Kerman
- County: Jiroft
- District: Sarduiyeh
- Rural District: Gevar

Population (2016)
  - Total: 353
- Time zone: UTC+3:30 (IRST)

Gevar-e Sofla (Persian: گور سفلی) (Note: Also romanized as Gevar-e Soflá; also known as Gevar-e Pā’īn) is a village in Gevar Rural District of Sarduiyeh District, Jiroft County, Kerman province, Iran.

== Demographics ==
=== Population ===
At the time of the 2006 National Census, the village's population was 446 in 124 households. The following census in 2011 counted 328 people in 98 households. The 2016 census measured the population of the village as 353 people in 105 households. It was the most populous village in its rural district.
