= Darb-e Behesht =

City in Kerman province, Iran

Darb-e Behesht Persian: درب بهشت
- City
- Location within Iran
- Coordinates: 29°13′59″N 57°20′23″E
- Country: Iran
- Province: Kerman
- County: Jiroft
- District: Sarduiyeh

Population (2016)
  - Total: 10,670
- Time zone: UTC+3:30 (IRST)

Darb-e Behesht (Persian: درب بهشت) is a city in, and the capital of, Sarduiyeh District of Jiroft County, Kerman province, Iran. It also serves as the administrative center for Sarduiyeh Rural District.

== Demographics ==
=== Population ===
At the time of the 2006 National Census, the city's population was 3,456 in 562 households. The following census in 2011 counted 6,538 people in 1,590 households. The 2016 census measured the population of the city as 10,670 people in 3,269 households.
