= Bandar-e Gaz =

City in Golestan Province, Iran

Bandar-e Gaz Persian: بندرگز
- City
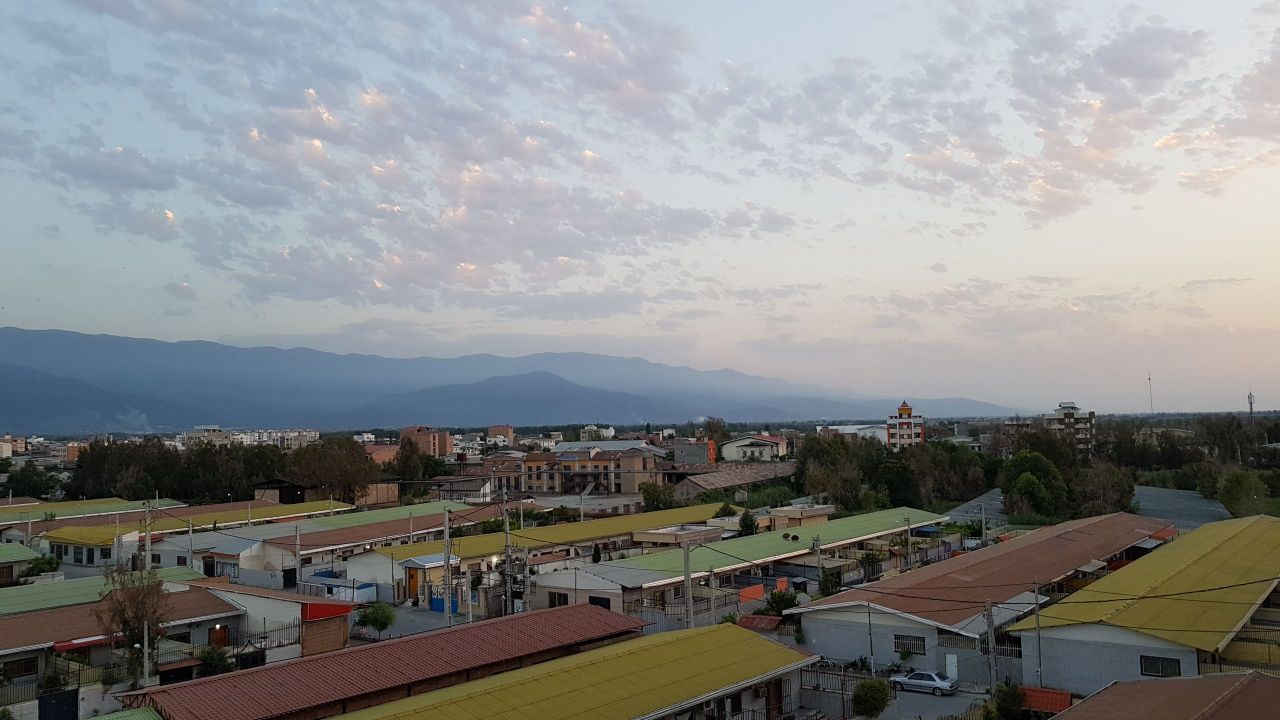

- Location within Iran
- Coordinates: 36°46′26″N 53°56′53″E
- Country: Iran
- Province: Golestan
- County: Bandar-e Gaz
- District: Central

Population (2016)
  - Total: 20,742
- Time zone: UTC+03:30 (IRST)

Bandar-e Gaz (Persian: بندرگز) (Note: Also romanized as Bandar-i-Gaz and Bander Gaz; also known as Bandar-i-Jaz) is a city in the Central District of Bandar-e Gaz County, Golestan Province, Iran, serving as capital of both the county and the district.

== Demographics ==
=== Language ===
The people of Bandar-e-Gaz speak the Mazandarani language.

=== Population ===
At the time of the 2006 National Census, the city's population was 17,923 in 4,679 households. The following census in 2011 counted 18,734 people in 5,481 households. The 2016 census measured the population of the city as 20,742 people in 6,715 households.

== Overview ==
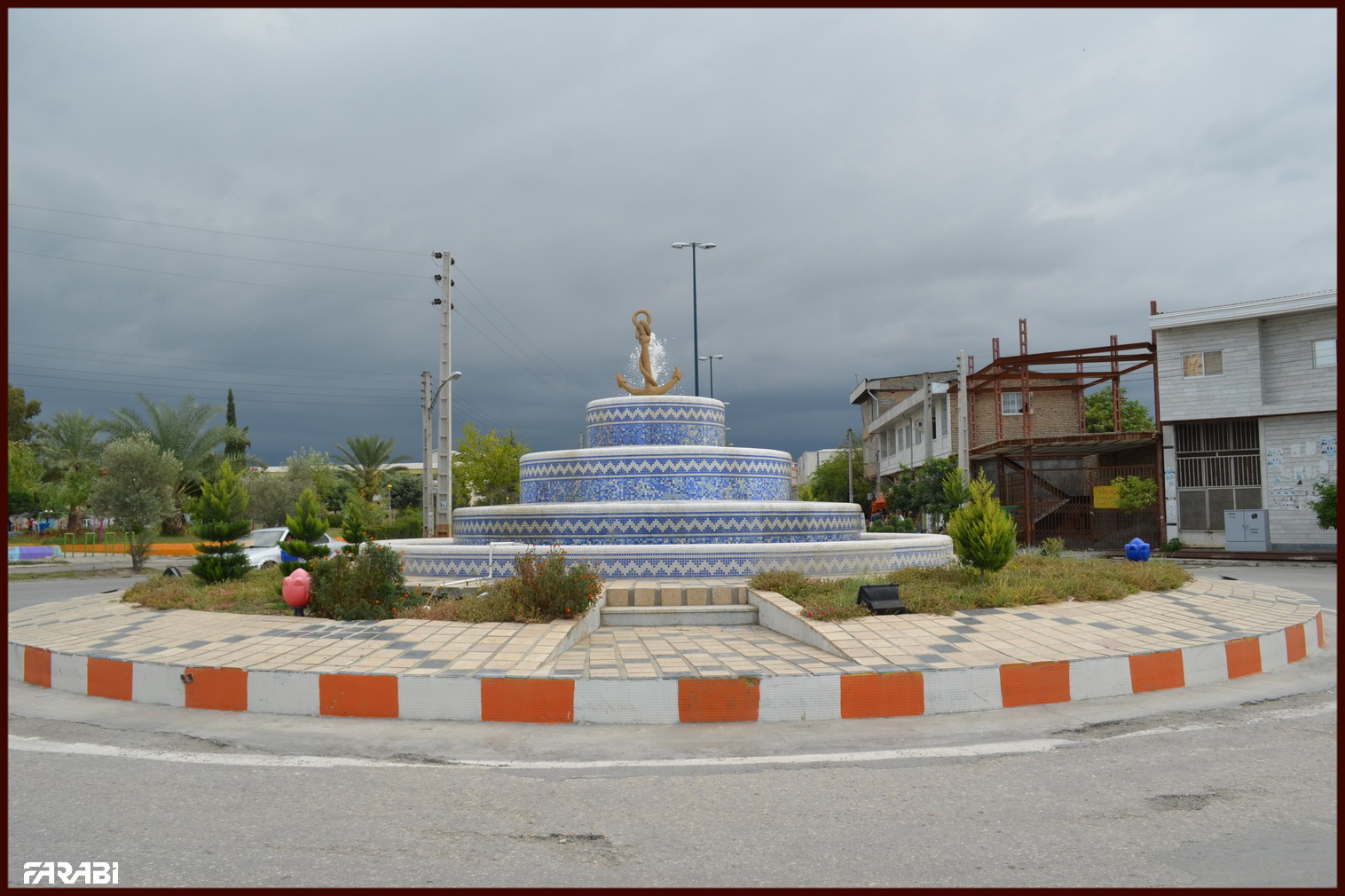

Bandar-e Gaz is in the southeastern fringes of Gorgan Bay (ru:Горганский залив), at a distance of 20 km south of Bandar Torkaman and 48 km from Gorgan.

Before the establishment of Bandar Torkaman, this port was the most important commercial port in the west of Mazandaran, Semnan and Khorasan. Bandar-e Gaz became an industrial center due to its location on the commercial highway in northwest Iran. Oil-extraction, rice-grinding and cotton-purifying factories were established in the city. The coastal areas of the city include wetlands, groves and wildlife.

== Climate ==
Climate data for Bandar-e Gaz (elevation: -14, precipitation normals) 2013-2023 36.767°N 53.95°E
Month	Jan	Feb	Mar	Apr	May	Jun	Jul	Aug	Sep	Oct	Nov	Dec	Year
Average precipitation mm (inches)	43.62 (1.72)	43.88 (1.73)	62.16 (2.45)	43.55 (1.71)	29.38 (1.16)	16.16 (0.64)	25.96 (1.02)	13.13 (0.52)	45.09 (1.78)	64.65 (2.55)	66.43 (2.62)	32.99 (1.30)	487 (19.2)
Average extreme snow depth cm (inches)	0 (0)	0.24 (0.09)	0 (0)	0 (0)	0 (0)	0 (0)	0 (0)	0 (0)	0 (0)	0 (0)	0.185 (0.07)	0 (0)	0.24 (0.09)
Average precipitation days	8.1	9.3	10.9	9.9	7.3	2.7	5.8	3.3	6.4	7.5	9.4	7.6	88.2
Average snowy days	0	0.4	0	0	0	0	0	0	0	0	0.4	0	0.8
Source: IRIMO(snow-precip days 2013-2022)

== See also ==
- Gaz (candy)
