= Geräte- und Akkumulatorenwerk Zwickau =

German battery manufacturer

Geräte- und Akkumulatorenwerk Zwickau GmbH
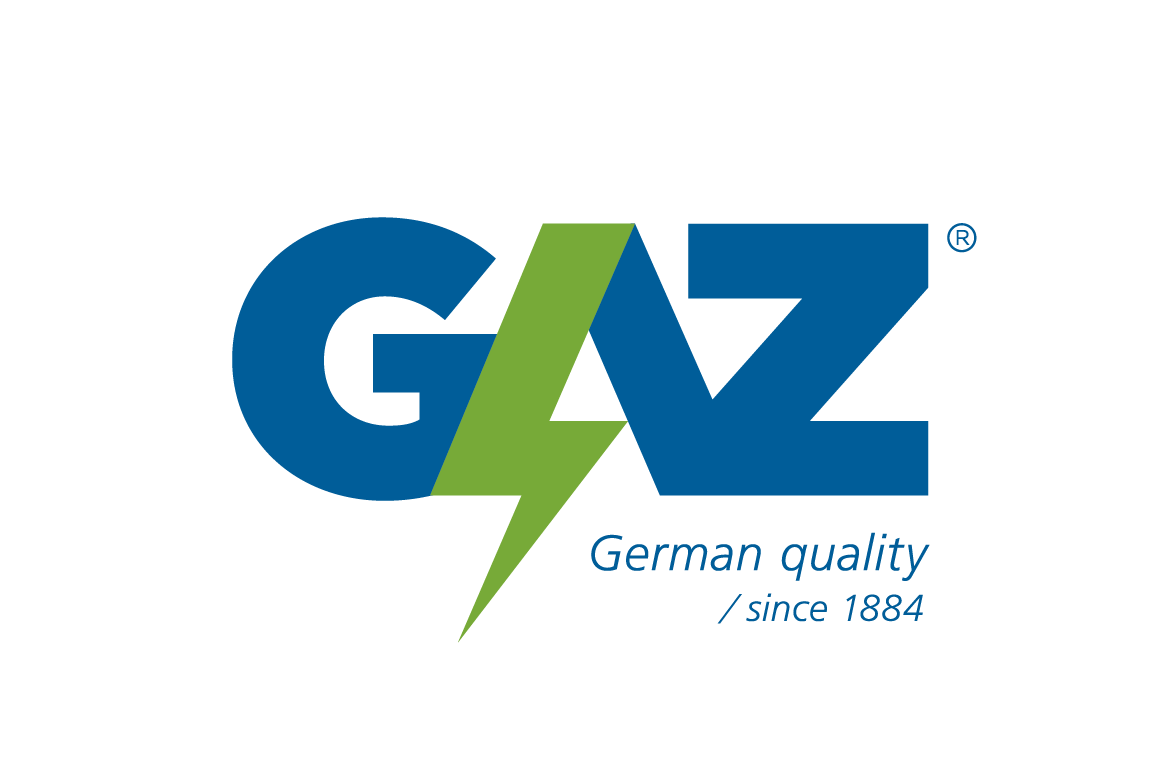
- Company type: Private (GmbH)
- Industry: Batteries
- Predecessor: Friemann & Wolf
- Founded: 1884
- Headquarters: Zwickau, Germany
- Parent: GAZ Energy a.s.
- Website: gaz-gmbh.com

Geräte- und Akkumulatorenwerk Zwickau (GAZ) is a German company specialized in designing and manufacturing of nickel-cadmium (Ni-Cd) batteries as well as battery storage systems based on lithium-ion cells. Founded in Zwickau, Saxony, as Friemann & Wolf in 1884, the company now has an international presence, focusing on European markets, the Middle East, Asia, and the Americas.

== History ==
=== Beginnings ===
Building on the Davy lamp, the Saxon engineer Carl Wolf developed a gasoline-powered safety miner's lamp capable of indicating impending firedamp explosions while shining brighter than previous designs and not giving off as much smoke as oil lamps did. In 1884, together with a business partner, Wolf founded Friemann & Wolf, or FrieWo. Initially based in a small workshop, the production quickly moved to a newly built factory in Reichenbacher Straße 68, Zwickau, the current location of GAZ.

In 1904, the company began producing carbide miner's lamps as well. Six years later, FrieWo introduced their first electric safety lamp powered by a lead-acid battery, and in 1913, a lamp equipped by a Ni-Cd battery. At this point, the company held at least 75 patents across several European and North American countries, and a year later, the 1,500,000th gasoline lamp was produced, and in 1915 the 1,000,000th carbide lamp. Some of these devices were also used in the trenches on the Western Front of WWI.

Meanwhile, possibly as early as in 1890, Wolf and his sons founded another company located in Reichenbacher Straße which eventually settled for the name Carl Wolf Söhne. All the produce of FrieWo except for lamps was diverted into the new company, including lighters, kerosine ovens, kitchen ware such as coffee grinders, and since 1899, also bicycles branded as Regina-Fahrrad.

=== 1918–1952 ===
Following the end of WWI, the subsidiaries of Friemann & Wolf G.m.b.H. in Belgium, France and the US were confiscated. Some of these companies soon established themselves as fully fledged manufacturers of miner's equipment on their respective markets, with Wolf Safety Lamp Company Ltd., founded in 1912 in Sheffield, UK, operating to this day.

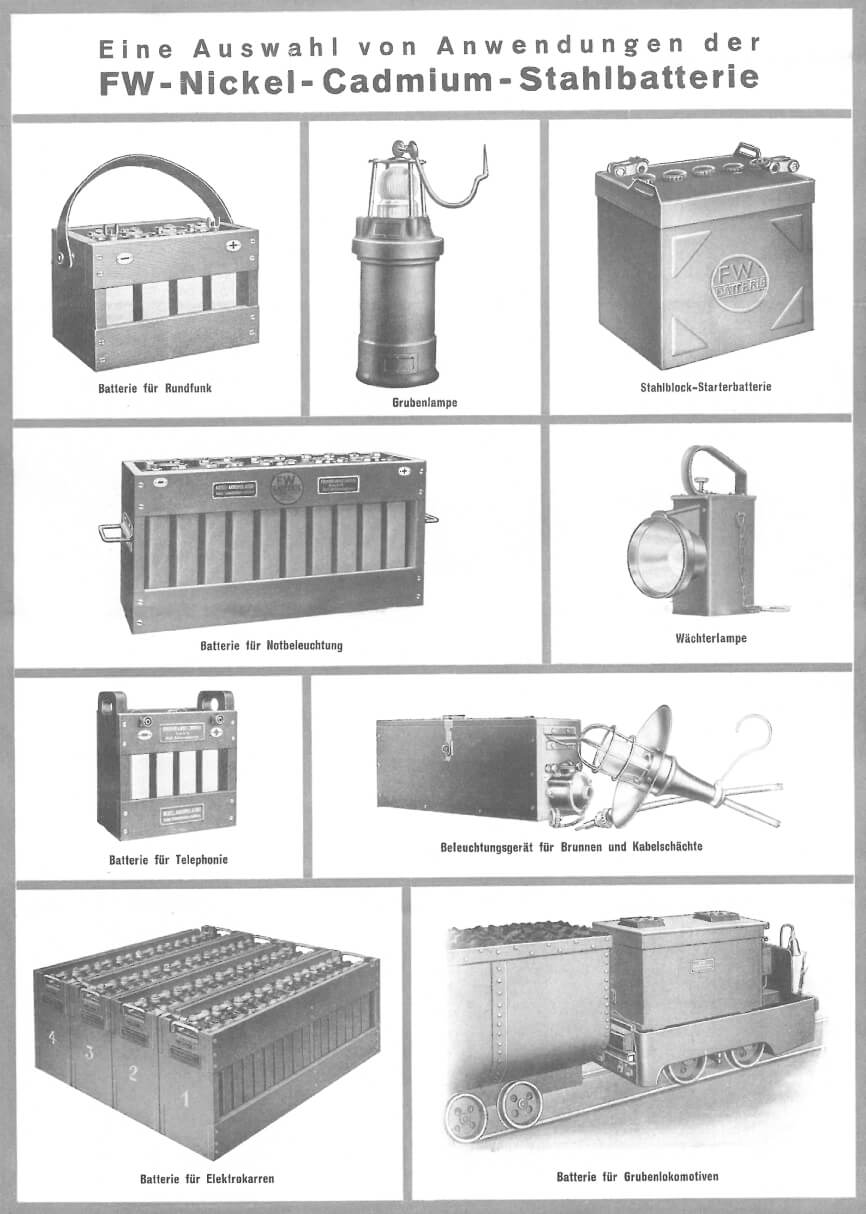
Friemann & Wolf's advertising leaflet showing various applications of Ni-Cd batteries, 1938

In the early 1920, cars became equipped with electric starter motors and FrieWo started producing car batteries for Horch and Audi. Battery manufacturing gradually became the company's second main field of activity, as later into the decade, FrieWo began supplying Deutsche Reichsbahn with Ni-Cd and lead-acid batteries. After the Nazi Party's ascend to power, the Wehrmacht became a major customer, and air raid lamps with blackened light bulbs were added to the portfolio.

Following the end of WWII, Zwickau found itself in the Soviet occupation zone, and in September 1945, the company was transferred under Soviet military administration. In March following year, the production facilities were to be disassembled and shipped to Poland. However, this would mean the cessation of battery production in Zwickau, which was both a part of the reparations claimed by the USSR, as well as needed for Soviet vehicles and other equipment stationed in Germany. Thus, in the end, a third of the equipment was allowed to stay.

At this point, the headquarters of FrieWo were located in Duisburg in the British occupation zone. A significant exchange of goods and money between Zwickau and Duisburg was maintained at least until September 1947 before relations were completely severed. The Duisburg site evolved into several companies including Friemann & Wolf Batterietechnik GmbH and FRIWO Gerätebau GmbH, an international manufacturer of chargers, battery packs, power supplies and alike.

=== Focusing on batteries ===
In April 1952, the USSR returned the Zwickau factory to the GDR, and it was renamed VEB Grubenlampenwerke Zwickau/Sa., or GLZ. The company produced a variety of electric lighting appliances such as railway signaling handlamps and torches, as well as portable Ni-Cd batteries. The production of carbide lamps ceased in 1958, and that of gasoline lamps in 1960, the company henceforth manufacturing electric miner's lamps only.

The focus now began to shift to the production of both lead and Ni-Cd batteries. As a result of measures including the opening of a modern assembly line, the battery production volume increased 17-times between 1952 and 1978. In July 1968, GLZ was incorporated into the kombinat VEB Galvanische Elemente, and some years later in a different kombinat focused on automotive, underlining GLZ's increased focus on the production of car batteries. These accounted for around 80 percent of the company's portfolio in 1979, while miner's equipment only made up some 5 percent of the produce.

In 1984, celebrating the 100th anniversary of the founding of Friemann & Wolf, the company was renamed Grubenlampen- und Akkumulatorenwerk Zwickau, or GAZ. Following the Peaceful Revolution and restructuring by the Treuhandanstalt, the VEB was broken up into several parts keen to attract Western investors and partners. The Ni-Cd battery production unit became Geräte- und Akkumulatorenwerk Zwickau GmbH, or GAZ in its current form, while other parts of the pre-1990 company remain located in or around Zwickau. These include the car battery manufacturer Clarios, formerly Johnson Controls, and GAZ Notstromsysteme GmbH producing emergency lighting.

In 2005, Geräte- und Akkumulatorenwerk Zwickau GmbH became a part of EnerSys, before having been acquired by Bochemie in 2019. Since 2025, GAZ is part of Bochemie Group's GAZ Energy division. According to a GAZ representative, the company is serving more than 120 markets across the world.

== Products ==
Apart from sinter plate batteries for aviation, GAZ currently manufactures three product ranges of Ni-Cd cells with pocket plate electrodes. All of GAZ' products are industrial-grade batteries often deployed in UPS systems, as renewable energy storage, in the oil and gas industry, but also aboard of ships or airplanes. Under the GAZ Energy brand, the company also offers lithium-ion battery storage systems designed for complementing medium and larger-scale renewable energy production, or for providing anciliary services within the electricity transmission system.
