= Anzan-e Gharbi Rural District =

Rural district in Golestan province, Iran

Anzan-e Gharbi Rural District Persian: دهستان انزان غربي
- Rural District
- Location within Iran
- Coordinates: 36°44′N 53°58′E
- Country: Iran
- Province: Golestan
- County: Bandar-e Gaz
- District: Central
- Established: 1987
- Capital: Gaz-e Gharbi

Population (2016)
  - Total: 5,162
- Time zone: UTC+3:30 (IRST)

Anzan-e Gharbi Rural District (Persian: دهستان انزان غربي) (Note: Formerly Anzan Rural District (دهستان انزان)) is in the Central District of Bandar-e Gaz County, Golestan province, Iran. Its capital is the village of Gaz-e Gharbi. The previous capital of the rural district was the village of Now Kandeh, now a city.

== Demographics ==
=== Population ===
At the time of the 2006 National Census, the rural district's population was 6,022 in 1,542 households. There were 5,837 inhabitants in 1,760 households at the following census of 2011. The 2016 census measured the population of the rural district as 5,162 in 1,740 households. The most populous of its eight villages was Gaz-e Gharbi, with 1,883 people.

=== Other villages in the rural district ===
- Dashti Kalateh-ye Gharbi
- Dashti Kalateh-ye Sharqi
- Gaz
- Kuh Sahra
- Valfara
- Vatana
