= Banafsheh Tappeh Rural District =

Rural district in Golestan province, Iran

Banafsheh Tappeh Rural District Persian: دهستان بنفشه تپه
- Rural District
- Location within Iran
- Coordinates: 36°44′N 53°55′E
- Country: Iran
- Province: Golestan
- County: Bandar-e Gaz
- District: Now Kandeh
- Established: 1997
- Capital: Jafa Kandeh

Population (2016)
  - Total: 1,772
- Time zone: UTC+3:30 (IRST)

Banafsheh Tappeh Rural District (Persian: دهستان بنفشه تپه) is in Now Kandeh District of Bandar-e Gaz County, Golestan province, Iran. Its capital is the village of Jafa Kandeh. The rural district was previously administered from the city of Now Kandeh.

== Demographics ==
=== Population ===
At the time of the 2006 National Census, the rural district's population was 2,114 in 573 households. There were 2,027 inhabitants in 615 households at the following census of 2011. The 2016 census measured the population of the rural district as 1,772 in 610 households. The most populous of its three villages was Jafa Kandeh, with 920 people.

=== Other villages in the rural district ===
- Banafsh Tappeh
- Estunabad
