= Now Kandeh =

City in Golestan province, Iran

Now Kandeh Persian: نوکنده
- City
- Location within Iran
- Coordinates: 36°44′16″N 53°54′33″E
- Country: Iran
- Province: Golestan
- County: Bandar-e Gaz
- District: Now Kandeh

Population (2016)
  - Total: 6,650
- Time zone: UTC+3:30 (IRST)

Now Kandeh (Persian: نوکنده) (Note: Also romanized as Naukandeh; also known as Nokandeh) is a city in, and the capital of, Now Kandeh District in Bandar-e Gaz County, Golestan province, Iran. As a village, it was the capital of Anzan Rural District (Note: Renamed Anzan-e Gharbi Rural District) until its capital was transferred to the village of Gaz-e Gharbi. It was then the administrative center for Banafsheh Tappeh Rural District until its capital was transferred to the village of Jafa Kandeh.

== Demographics ==
=== Language ===
The people of Now Kandeh speak the Mazandarani language.

=== Population ===
At the time of the 2006 National Census, the city's population was 7,601 in 2,058 households. The following census in 2011 counted 7,155 people in 2,220 households. The 2016 census measured the population of the city as 6,650 people in 2,316 households.

== Notable people ==
- Ahmad Mazani, Iranian cleric and politician
- Mahlagha Mallah, nearby environmental activist
