= Livan Rural District =

Rural district in Golestan province, Iran

Livan Rural District Persian: دهستان ليوان
- Rural District
- Location within Iran
- Coordinates: 36°44′N 53°53′E
- Country: Iran
- Province: Golestan
- County: Bandar-e Gaz
- District: Now Kandeh
- Established: 1997
- Capital: Livan-e Sharqi

Population (2016)
  - Total: 4,854
- Time zone: UTC+3:30 (IRST)

Livan Rural District (Persian: دهستان ليوان) is in Now Kandeh District of Bandar-e Gaz County, Golestan province, Iran. Its capital is the village of Livan-e Sharqi.

== Demographics ==
=== Population ===
At the time of the 2006 National Census, the rural district's population was 5,418 in 1,789 households. There were 5,304 inhabitants in 1,682 households at the following census of 2011. The 2016 census measured the population of the rural district as 4,854 in 1,650 households. The most populous of its five villages was Livan-e Sharqi, with 2,240 people.

=== Other villages in the rural district ===
- Kohneh Kolbad
- Livan-e Gharbi
- Talur
