= Gaz, Hormozgan =

Gaz گز
- Village
- Location within Iran
- Coordinates: 26°25′02″N 57°11′40″E
- Country: Iran
- Province: Hormozgan
- County: Minab
- Bakhsh: Byaban
- Rural District: Byaban

Population (2006)
  - Total: 693
- Time zone: UTC+3:30 (IRST)
  - Summer (DST): UTC+4:30 (IRDT)

Gaz (Persian: گز; also known as Gaz-e Ţāherī) is a village in Byaban Rural District, Byaban District, Minab County, Hormozgan Province, Iran. At the 2006 census, its population was 693, in 120 families.
