= Baghuiyeh-ye Do =

Baghuiyeh-ye Do باغوئيه2
- Village
- Location within Iran
- Coordinates: 29°23′16″N 57°06′43″E
- Country: Iran
- Province: Kerman
- County: Rabor
- Bakhsh: Hanza
- Rural District: Hanza

Population (2006)
  - Total: 365
- Time zone: UTC+3:30 (IRST)
  - Summer (DST): UTC+4:30 (IRDT)

Baghuiyeh-ye Do (Persian: باغوئيه2, also Romanized as Bāghū’īyeh-ye Do; also known as Bāghūyeh) is a village in Hanza Rural District, Hanza District, Rabor County, Kerman Province, Iran. At the 2006 census, its population was 365, in 81 families.
