= Baghuyeh =

Baghuyeh باغويه
- Village
- Location within Iran
- Coordinates: 26°53′14″N 53°41′33″E
- Country: Iran
- Province: Hormozgan
- County: Bandar Lengeh
- Bakhsh: Shibkaveh
- Rural District: Moqam

Population (2006)
  - Total: 112
- Time zone: UTC+3:30 (IRST)
  - Summer (DST): UTC+4:30 (IRDT)

Baghuyeh (Persian: باغويه, also Romanized as Bāghūyeh; also known as Bāghu and Bāqū) is a village in Moqam Rural District, Shibkaveh District, Bandar Lengeh County, Hormozgan Province, Iran. At the 2006 census, its population was 112, in 18 families.
