= Baghuiyeh, Baft =

Baghuiyeh باغوييه
- Village
- Location within Iran
- Coordinates: 29°18′36″N 56°30′57″E
- Country: Iran
- Province: Kerman
- County: Baft
- Bakhsh: Central
- Rural District: Fathabad

Population (2006)
  - Total: 24
- Time zone: UTC+3:30 (IRST)
  - Summer (DST): UTC+4:30 (IRDT)

Baghuiyeh (Persian: باغوييه, also Romanized as Bāghūīyeh; also known as Bāghūeeyeh) is a village in Fathabad Rural District, in the Central District of Baft County, Kerman Province, Iran. At the 2006 census, its population was 24, in 7 families.
