= Gaz-e Lang =

Gaz-e Lang گزلنگ
- Village
- Location within Iran
- Coordinates: 28°17′00″N 58°19′00″E
- Country: Iran
- Province: Kerman
- County: Anbarabad
- Bakhsh: Jebalbarez-e Jonubi
- Rural District: Nargesan

Population (2006)
  - Total: 40
- Time zone: UTC+3:30 (IRST)
  - Summer (DST): UTC+4:30 (IRDT)

Gaz-e Lang (Persian: گزلنگ) is a village in Nargesan Rural District, Jebalbarez-e Jonubi District, Anbarabad County, Kerman Province, Iran. At the 2006 census, its population was 40, in 14 families.
