= Friwo Gerätebau =

German electronics company

FRIWO Gerätebau GmbH
- Company type: GmbH
- Industry: Electronics
- Founded: 1971
- Headquarters: Ostbevern, Germany
- Key people: Rolf Schwirz (CEO)
- Products: Chargers; Battery packs; Power supplies; LED Drivers; E²MS
- Revenue: €99.4 Million (2020)
- Owner: FRIWO AG
- Number of employees: 2,608 (2020)
- Website: www.friwo.com/en

Friwo Gerätebau GmbH (English: FRIWO equipment manufacturing company) is a German company, headquartered in Ostbevern, Germany. Its origin can be traced back to 1881. Since the development of the first power supply unit in 1971, the company operates worldwide and manufactures battery chargers, battery packs, power supplies, LED drivers and drive units. The company also provides electronic design and manufacturing services (E²MS) in Europe.

== Company ==
The Friwo Gerätebau GmbH, a subsidiary of the General Standard listed Friwo AG, develops, manufactures and sells drivers, power supplies and chargers under the brand name Friwo LED for a variety of applications, battery packs, and electronic driving solutions. Other products include LED lighting technology, electric mobility, power tools, consumer equipment, medical devices, and industrial automation machinery.

Friwo was officially founded in 1971 and developed plug-in power supplies, and eventually became one of the largest manufacturers of them, of which some are EuP and Energy Star-compliant. In 2005, output volume exceeded one billion units. E²MS services (Electronics Engineering and Manufacturing Services) are also offered.

The principal shareholder of Friwo AG is a subsidiary of VTC Industry Holding GmbH & Co. KG, Munich.

== Locations ==
- Ostbevern, Germany (headquarters including manufacturing, research & development and administration)
- Dresden, Germany (manufacturing, research & development E-mobility)
- Dong Nai, Vietnam (manufacturing)
- Ho-Chi-Minh-City, Vietnam (converter & choke production)
- Shenzhen, China (sales office, development and purchasing)
- Bengaluru, India (manufacturing)

== History ==
Nearly a century prior to the formation of Friwo, Friemann & Wolf was founded in 1881 by Carl Wolf in Zwickau, western Saxony. This company introduced the gasoline safety pit lamp for coal mining toward the end of the nineteenth century. After the Second World War, the company was expropriated without compensation as an armaments manufacturer in the Soviet occupation zone. The branch office in Duisburg became the new headquarters of Friemann & Wolf in West Germany. In 1971, Friwo Gerätebau GmbH (FWGB) was spun off in Duisburg and a production plant in Ostbevern was acquired at the same time and began manufacturing some of the first plug-in power supply units. By 1973 the company was producing around 5000 devices per day. By 1981 the company achieved a market share of 60 percent.

In 1983, Friemann & Wolf along with Friwo Gerätebau was purchased by CEAG. Under the CEAG umbrella. In the year 1990, Friwo North America was established in Frederick/USA and Friwo Far East Ltd. was established with manufacturing facilities in Shenzhen. In 2001, Friwo Tokyo opened in Japan and Friwo São Paulo in Brazil.

By 1990, Friwo's sales reached an annual volume of DM 100 million. In 1991, the competitor Bartec-Compit was purchased. In 1992, Friwo became the first company in the industry to be certified according to DIN EN ISO 9001. A year later, the first charger for NiMH batteries was developed. In 1993, Friwo merged with its subsidiary Silberkraft Lichtakkumulatoren GmbH to form Friwo Silberkraft GmbH. In 1994, pit lamp production was discontinued.

In 2002, Friwo's business was split into two divisions, Friwo Mobile Power (FMP) and Friwo Power Solutions (FPS).

In 2008, the Friwo Mobile Power division (now Flextronics Power) was sold first, and then Cardea Holding GmbH, a subsidiary of VTC Industrieholding GmbH.

On May 25, 2009, CEAG was renamed Friwo AG.

In 2015, the company opened a manufacturing facility in Dong Nai, Vietnam. In the same year, Friwo acquired a converter and choke manufacturing facility near Ho Chi Minh City. In January 2018, Friwo became DIN EN ISO 13485 certified. In December 2018, Friwo acquired Emerge Engineering, a developer and manufacturer of components for electric drives.
