= Sar Taq, Lorestan =

Sar Taq سرطاق
- Village
- Location within Iran
- Coordinates: 33°26′00″N 48°18′00″E
- Country: Iran
- Province: Lorestan
- County: Khorramabad
- Bakhsh: Central
- Rural District: Koregah-e Gharbi

Population (2006)
  - Total: 38
- Time zone: UTC+3:30 (IRST)
  - Summer (DST): UTC+4:30 (IRDT)

Sar Taq (Persian: سرطاق, also Romanized as Sar Ţāq) is a village in Koregah-e Gharbi Rural District, in the Central District of Khorramabad County, Lorestan Province, Iran. At the 2006 census, its population was 38, in 8 families.
