= Baghu, Hormozgan =

Baghu باغو
- Village
- Location within Iran
- Coordinates: 27°18′41″N 56°26′26″E
- Country: Iran
- Province: Hormozgan
- County: Bandar Abbas
- Bakhsh: Qaleh Qazi
- Rural District: Sarkhun

Population (2006)
  - Total: 353
- Time zone: UTC+3:30 (IRST)
  - Summer (DST): UTC+4:30 (IRDT)

Baghu (Persian: باغو, also Romanized as Bāghū and Baghoo) is a village in Sarkhun Rural District, Qaleh Qazi District, Bandar Abbas County, Hormozgan Province, Iran. At the 2006 census, its population was 353, in 77 families.
