= Dalfard Rural District =

Rural district in Kerman province, Iran

Dalfard Rural District Persian: دهستان دلفارد
- Rural District
- Location within Iran
- Coordinates: 28°54′38″N 57°38′49″E
- Country: Iran
- Province: Kerman
- County: Jiroft
- District: Sarduiyeh
- Capital: Raziabad

Population (2016)
  - Total: 6,620
- Time zone: UTC+3:30 (IRST)

Dalfard Rural District (Persian: دهستان دلفارد) is in Sarduiyeh District of Jiroft County, Kerman province, Iran. Its capital is the village of Raziabad.

== Demographics ==
=== Population ===
At the time of the 2006 National Census, the rural district's population was 4,385 in 955 households. There were 6,157 inhabitants in 1,641 households at the following census of 2011. The 2016 census measured the population of the rural district as 6,620 in 2,356 households. The most populous of its 110 villages was Darrehi, with 817 people.
