= Now Kandeh District =

District in Golestan province, Iran

Now Kandeh District Persian: بخش نوکنده
- District
- Location within Iran
- Coordinates: 36°44′N 53°54′E
- Country: Iran
- Province: Golestan
- County: Bandar-e Gaz
- Established: 1997
- Capital: Now Kandeh

Population (2016)
  - Total: 13,276
- Time zone: UTC+3:30 (IRST)

Now Kandeh District (Persian: بخش نوکنده) is in Bandar-e Gaz County, Golestan province, Iran. Its capital is the city of Now Kandeh.

== Demographics ==
=== Population ===
At the time of the 2006 National Census, the district's population was 15,133 in 4,120 households. The following census in 2011 counted 14,486 people in 4,497 households. The 2016 census measured the population of the district as 13,276 inhabitants in 4,576 households.

=== Administrative divisions ===
Now Kandeh District Population
Administrative Divisions	2006	2011	2016
Banafsheh Tappeh RD	2,114	2,027	1,772
Livan RD	5,418	5,304	4,854
Now Kandeh (city)	7,601	7,155	6,650
Total	15,133	14,486	13,276
RD = Rural District
