= Gevar Rural District =

Rural district in Kerman province, Iran

Gevar Rural District Persian: دهستان گور
- Rural District
- Location within Iran
- Coordinates: 29°10′28″N 57°38′06″E
- Country: Iran
- Province: Kerman
- County: Jiroft
- District: Sarduiyeh
- Capital: Sahebabad

Population (2016)
  - Total: 6,339
- Time zone: UTC+3:30 (IRST)

Gevar Rural District (Persian: دهستان گور) is in Sarduiyeh District of Jiroft County, Kerman province, Iran. Its capital is the village of Sahebabad. The previous capital of the rural district was the village of Qalatuiyeh.

== Demographics ==
=== Population ===
At the time of the 2006 National Census, the rural district's population was 5,050 in 1,234 households. There were 7,857 inhabitants in 2,132 households at the following census of 2011. The 2016 census measured the population of the rural district as 6,339 in 2,214 households. The most populous of its 141 villages was Gevar-e Sofla, with 353 people.
