= Sarduiyeh Rural District =

Rural district in Kerman province, Iran

Sarduiyeh Rural District Persian: دهستان ساردوئیه
- Rural District
- Location within Iran
- Coordinates: 29°06′03″N 57°19′55″E
- Country: Iran
- Province: Kerman
- County: Jiroft
- District: Sarduiyeh
- Capital: Darb-e Behesht

Population (2016)
  - Total: 15,529
- Time zone: UTC+3:30 (IRST)

Sarduiyeh Rural District (Persian: دهستان ساردوئیه) is in Sarduiyeh District of Jiroft County, Kerman province, Iran. It is administered from the city of Darb-e Behesht.

== Demographics ==
=== Population ===
At the time of the 2006 National Census, the rural district's population was 12,594 in 2,326 households. There were 15,827 inhabitants in 4,144 households at the following census of 2011. The 2016 census measured the population of the rural district as 15,529 in 5,014 households. The most populous of its 234 villages was Darreh Rud, with 792 people.
