= Central District (Bandar-e Gaz County) =

District in Golestan province, Iran

Central District (Bandar-e Gaz County) Persian: بخش مرکزی شهرستان بندر گز
- District
- Location within Iran
- Coordinates: 36°44′N 53°59′E
- Country: Iran
- Province: Golestan
- County: Bandar-e Gaz
- Established: 1997
- Capital: Bandar-e Gaz

Population (2016)
  - Total: 32,854
- Time zone: UTC+3:30 (IRST)

The Central District of Bandar-e Gaz County (Persian: بخش مرکزی شهرستان بندر گز) is in Golestan province, Iran. Its capital is the city of Bandar-e Gaz.

== Demographics ==
=== Population ===
At the time of the 2006 National Census, the district's population was 31,046 in 7,939 households. The following census in 2011 counted 31,829 people in 9,288 households. The 2016 census measured the population of the district as 32,854 inhabitants in 10,671 households.

=== Administrative divisions ===
Central District (Bandar-e Gaz County) Population
| Administrative Divisions | 2006 | 2011 | 2016 |
|---|---|---|---|
| Anzan-e Gharbi RD (Note: Formerly Anzan Rural District) | 6,022 | 5,837 | 5,162 |
| Anzan-e Sharqi RD | 7,101 | 7,258 | 6,950 |
| Bandar-e Gaz (city) | 17,923 | 18,734 | 20,742 |
| Total | 31,046 | 31,829 | 32,854 |
RD = Rural District
