= Bandar-e Gaz County =

County in Golestan province, Iran

Bandar-e Gaz County Persian: شهرستان بندر گز
- County
- Location of Bandar-e Gaz County in Golestan province (left, yellow)

- Location of Golestan province in Iran
- Coordinates: 36°45′N 53°57′E
- Country: Iran
- Province: Golestan
- Established: 1997
- Capital: Bandar-e Gaz
- Districts: Central, Now Kandeh

Population (2016)
  - Total: 46,130
- Time zone: UTC+3:30 (IRST)

Bandar-e Gaz County (Persian: شهرستان بندر گز) is a county located in the western part of Golestan province, Iran. Its capital is Bandar-e Gaz.

== Demographics ==
=== Population ===
At the time of the 2006 National Census, the county's population was 46,179 in 12,059 households. The following census in 2011 counted 46,315 people in 13,775 households. The 2016 census measured the population of the county as 46,130 in 15,247 households.

=== Administrative divisions ===
Bandar-e Gaz County's population history and administrative structure over three consecutive censuses are shown in the following table.

Bandar-e Gaz County Population
Administrative Divisions	2006	2011	2016
Central District	31,046	31,829	32,854
Anzan-e Gharbi RD (Note: Formerly Anzan Rural District)	6,022	5,837	5,162
Anzan-e Sharqi RD	7,101	7,258	6,950
Bandar-e Gaz (city)	17,923	18,734	20,742
Now Kandeh District	15,133	14,486	13,276
Banafsheh Tappeh RD	2,114	2,027	1,772
Livan RD	5,418	5,304	4,854
Now Kandeh (city)	7,601	7,155	6,650
Total	46,179	46,315	46,130
RD = Rural District

== See also ==
Media related to Bandar-e Gaz County at Wikimedia Commons
