= Sarduiyeh District =

District in Kerman province, Iran

Sarduiyeh District Persian: بخش ساردوئیه
- District
- Location within Iran
- Coordinates: 29°03′37″N 57°28′24″E
- Country: Iran
- Province: Kerman
- County: Jiroft
- Capital: Darb-e Behesht

Population (2016)
  - Total: 39,158
- Time zone: UTC+3:30 (IRST)

Sarduiyeh District (Persian: بخش ساردوئیه) is in Jiroft County, Kerman province, Iran. Its capital is the city of Darb-e Behesht.

== Demographics ==
=== Population ===
At the time of the 2006 National Census, the district's population was 25,485 in 5,077 households. The following census in 2011 counted 36,379 people in 9,507 households. The 2016 census measured the population of the district as 39,158 inhabitants in 12,853 households.

=== Administrative divisions ===
Sarduiyeh District Population
Administrative Divisions	2006	2011	2016
Dalfard RD	4,385	6,157	6,620
Gevar RD	5,050	7,857	6,339
Sarduiyeh RD	12,594	15,827	15,529
Darb-e Behesht (city)	3,456	6,538	10,670
Total	25,485	36,379	39,158
RD = Rural District
